= List of Acacia species =

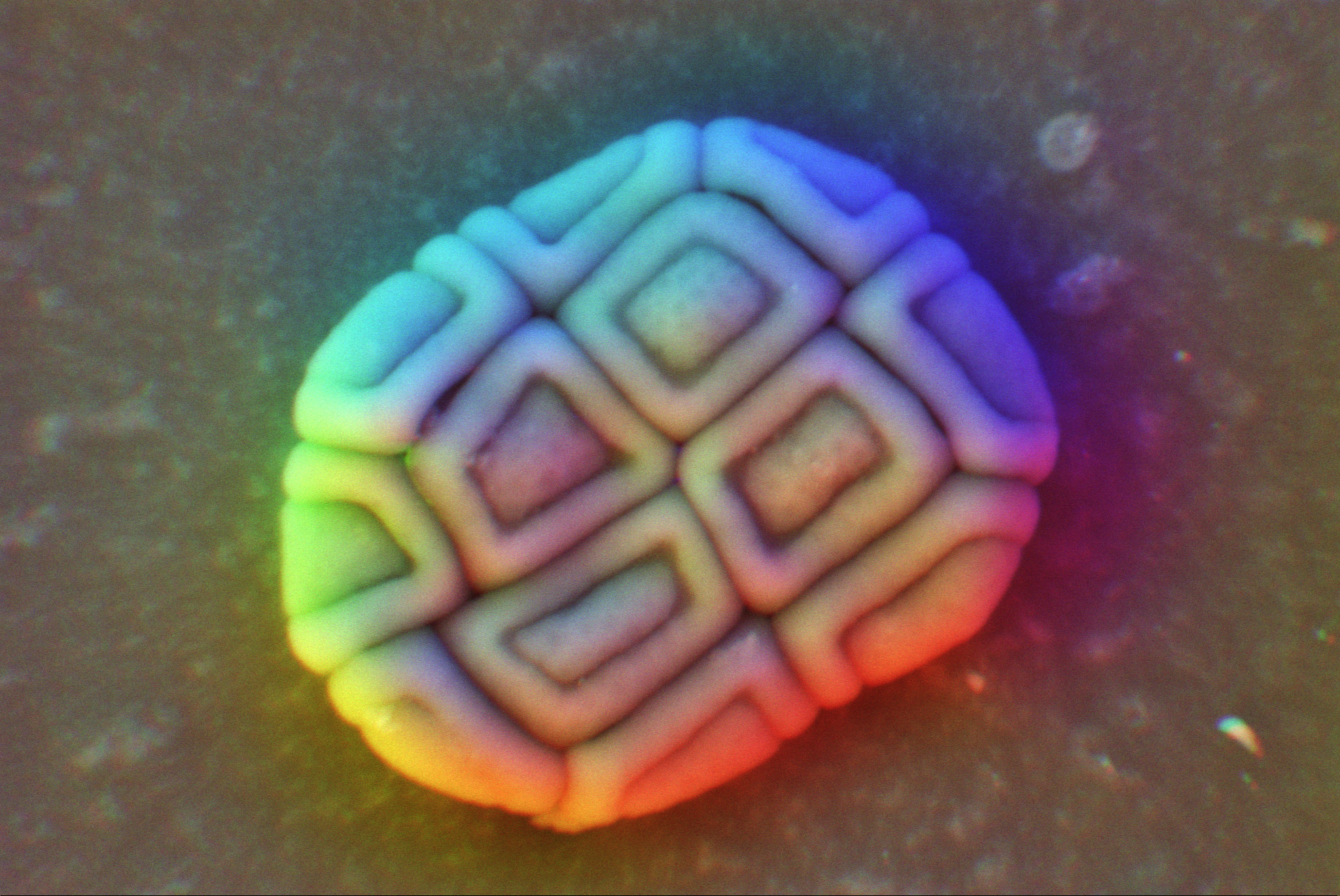
SEM image of Acacia pollen (about 50 microns long)

There are 1085 species of Acacia accepted by Plants of the World Online as at December 2024, with species native to Australia, New Guinea, Southeast Asia, Hawaii and the Mascarene Islands, and introduced to other countries.

An older concept of Acacia included about 1350 species from Australia, Africa, tropical America and Asia, but following decisions made at the 2011 International Botanical Congresses, the name Acacia was reserved for species found in Australia, New Guinea and Southeast Asia.

Some species, previously included in Acacia and distributed in the Indian Ocean, tropical Asia and tropical America are now classified under:

- Vachellia 157 species (pantropical)
- Senegalia 220 species (pantropical)
- Parasenegalia: 11 species (South America)
- Pseudosenegalia: 2 species (Bolivia)
- Acaciella : 15 species (Americas)
- Mariosousa: 14 species (Americas)

== Species list ==
This is a list of species of Acacia accepted by Plants of the World Online as of November 2023.

== A ==
- Acacia abbatiana (Qld.)
- Acacia abbreviata (N.T.)
- Acacia abrupta (W.A., N.T.)
- Acacia acanthaster (W.A.)
- Acacia acanthoclada — harrow wattle
  - Acacia acanthoclada subsp. acanthoclada (W.A., Vic., N.S.W.)
  - Acacia acanthoclada subsp. glaucescens (W.A.)
- Acacia acellerata (W.A.)
- Acacia acinacea — gold dust wattle, wreath wattle, round-leaf wattle (S.A., Vic., N.S.W.)
- Acacia aciphylla (W.A.)
- Acacia acoma (W.A.)
- Acacia acradenia – Velvet Hill wattle, silky wattle (W.A., N.T., Qld.)
- Acacia acrionastes (Qld., N.S.W.)
- Acacia acuaria (W.A.)
- Acacia aculeatissima – thin-leaf wattle or snake wattle (Vic., N.S.W.)
- Acacia aculeiformis (W.A.)
- Acacia acuminata — raspberry jam, fine leaf jam (W.A.)
- Acacia acutata (W.A.)
- Acacia adenogonia (W.A.)
- Acacia adinophylla (W.A.)
- Acacia adjutrices (W.A.)
- Acacia adnata (W.A.)
- Acacia adoxa (W.A., N.T.)
- Acacia adsurgens (W.A., N.T., Qld., S.A.)
- Acacia adunca — Wallangarra wattle, cascade wattle (N.S.W., Qld.)
- Acacia aemula (W.A.)
  - Acacia aemula subsp. aemula
  - Acacia aemula subsp. muricata
- Acacia aestivalis (W.A.)
- Acacia alata — winged wattle (W.A.)
- Acacia alaticaulis (N.S.W.)
- Acacia alcockii – Alcock's wattle (S.A.)
- Acacia alexandri (W.A.)
- Acacia alleniana (N.T., Qld.)
- Acacia alpina — alpine wattle (N.S.W., Vic.)
- Acacia amanda (N.T.)
- Acacia amblygona (W.A., Qld., N.S.W.)
- Acacia amblyophylla (W.A.)
- Acacia amentifera (N.T.)
- Acacia ammitia (Qld.)
- Acacia ammobia – Mount Connor wattle (N.T., S.A.)
- Acacia ammophila (Qld.)
- Acacia amoena – boomerang wattle (Qld., N.S.W., Vic.)
- Acacia ampliata (W.A.)
- Acacia ampliceps – salt wattle (N.T., W.A.)
- Acacia amputata (W.A.)
- Acacia amyctica (W.A.)
- Acacia anadenia (Qld.)
- Acacia anarthros (W.A.)
- Acacia anasilla (W.A.)
- Acacia anastema — sandridge gidgee, sandplain gidgee (W.A.)
- Acacia anastomosa – Carson River wattle (W.A.)
- Acacia anaticeps – duck-headed wattled (W.A.)
- Acacia anceps – Port Lincoln wattle, two edged wattle (S.A., W.A.)
- Acacia ancistrocarpa – Fitzroy wattle (W.A., N.T., Qld.)
- Acacia ancistrophylla (W.A., S.A., Vic.)
- Acacia andrewsii (W.A.)
- Acacia aneura — mulga (W.A., N.T., S.A., Qld., N.S.W., Vic.)
- Acacia anfractuosa (W.A.)
- Acacia angusta (Qld.)
- Acacia anomala — grass wattle, Chittering grass wattle (W.A.)
- Acacia anserina – hairy sandstone wattle (W.A.)
- Acacia anthochaera – Kimberly's wattle (W.A.)
- Acacia aphanoclada – Nullagine ghost wattle (W.A.)
- Acacia aphylla — leafless rock wattle (W.A.)
- Acacia applanata — grass wattle (W.A.)
- Acacia aprepta – Miles mulga (Qld.)
- Acacia aprica – blunt wattle (W.A.)
- Acacia aptaneura – slender mulga (W.A., N.T., S.A., Qld.)
- Acacia arafurica (N.T.)
- Acacia araneosa – Balcanoona wattle or spidery wattle (S.A.)
- Acacia arbiana – Tony's wattle (Qld.)
- Acacia arcuatilis (W.A.)
- Acacia areolata (W.A.)
- Acacia argentina (Qld.)
- Acacia argutifolia – East Barrens wattle (W.A.)
- Acacia argyraea (W.A., N.T., Qld.)
- Acacia argyrodendron – black gidyea, blackwood (Qld.)
- Acacia argyrophylla – silver mulga (S.A.)
- Acacia argyrotricha – Bracker wattle (Qld.)
- Acacia arida – arid wattle (W.A.)
- Acacia aristulata – Watheroo wattle (W.A.)
- Acacia armigera – fierce wattle (W.A.)
- Acacia armillata (Qld.)
- Acacia armitii (N.T., Qld.)
- Acacia arrecta (W.A.)
- Acacia ascendens (W.A.)
- Acacia asepala (W.A.)
- Acacia ashbyae (W.A.)
- Acacia asparagoides (N.S.W.)
- Acacia aspera (Vic., N.S.W.)
  - Acacia aspera subsp. aspera (Vic., N.S.W.)
  - Acacia aemula subsp. parviceps (Vic.)
- Acacia asperulacea (W.A., N.T., Qld.)
- Acacia assimilis (W.A.)
  - Acacia assimilis subsp. assimilis
  - Acacia assisimilis subsp. atroviridis
- Acacia ataxiphylla (W.A.)
  - Acacia ataxiphylla subsp. ataxiphylla
  - Acacia ataxiphylla subsp. magna
- Acacia atkinsiana – Atkin's wattle (W.A.)
- Acacia atopa (W.A.)
- Acacia atrox – Myall Creek wattle (N.S.W.)
  - Acacia atrox subsp. atrox
  - Acacia atrox subsp. planiticola
- Acacia attenuata (Qld.)
- Acacia aulacocarpa (Qld., N.S.W., P.N.G.)
- Acacia aulacophylla (W.A.)
- Acacia auratiflora – orange-flowered wattle (W.A.)
- Acacia aureocrinita (N.S.W.)
- Acacia auricoma – Petermann wattle, alumaru, nyalpilintji wattle (W.A., N.T.)
- Acacia auriculiformis – ear-pod wattle, northern black wattle, Darwin black wattle (Maluku, P.N.G., N.T., Qld.)
- Acacia auripila – Rudall River myall (W.A.)
- Acacia auronitens (W.A.)
- Acacia ausfeldii – Ausfeld's wattle, whipstick cinnamon wattle (N.S.W., Vic.)
- Acacia awestoniana – Stirling Range wattle (W.A.)
- Acacia axillaris – midlands mimosa, midlands wattle (Tas.)
- Acacia ayersiana – Ayers Rock mulga, broad-leaf mulga, Uluru mulga, blue mulga (W.A., N.T., S.A.)

== B ==
- Acacia baileyana – Cootamundra wattle, Bailey's wattle, golden mimosa (N.S.W.)
- Acacia baeuerlenii (Qld., N.S.W.)
- Acacia bakeri – marblewood, white marblewood, Baker's wattle, scrub wattle (Qld., N.S.W.)
- Acacia balsamea – balsam wattle (W.A.)
- Acacia bancroftiorum – Bancroft's wattle (Qld.)
- Acacia barakulensis – waajie wattle (Qld.)
- Acacia barattensis – Baratta wattle (S.A.)
- Acacia barbinervis (W.A.)
  - Acacia barbinervis subsp. barbinervis
  - Acacia barbinervis subsp. borealis
- Acacia barrettiorum – Barrett's wattle (W.A.)
- Acacia barringtonensis – Barrington wattle (N.S.W.)
- Acacia bartlei – Bartle's wattle (W.A.)
- Acacia basedowii – Basedow's wattle (W.A., S.A., N.T.)
- Acacia baueri – tiny wattle (N.S.W., Qld.)
  - Acacia baueri subsp. aspera
  - Acacia baueri subsp. baueri
- Acacia baxteri – Baxter's wattle (W.A.)
- Acacia beadleana (N.S.W.)
- Acacia beauverdiana – pukkati (W.A.)
- Acacia beckleri – Barrier Range wattle (S.A., N.S.W.)
  - Acacia beckleri subsp. beckleri
  - Acacia beckleri subsp. megaspherica
- Acacia benthamii – Bentham's wattle (W.A.)
- Acacia besleyi – Bes' wattle (W.A.)
- Acacia betchei – red-tip wattle (N.S.W., Qld.)
- Acacia bidentata (W.A.)
- Acacia bifaria (W.A.)
- Acacia biflora – two-flowered acacia (W.A.)
- Acacia binata – (W.A.)
- Acacia binervata – two-veined hickory (N.S.W., Qld.)
- Acacia binervia – coast myall, coastal myall, coastal wattle, kai'arrawan (N.S.W., Vic.)
- Acacia bivenosa – two-nerved wattle, two-veined wattle, hill umbrella bush, dune wattle, Cable Beach wattle (W.A., N.T., Qld.)
- Acacia blakei
  - Acacia blakei subsp. blakei – Blake's wattle (N.S.W., Qld)
  - Acacia blakei subsp. diphylla – Wollomombi wattle (N.S.W., Qld)
- Acacia blakelyi (W.A.)
- Acacia blaxellii – Blaxell's wattle (W.A.)
- Acacia blayana – Blay's wattle, Brogo wattle (N.S.W.)
- Acacia boormanii – Snowy River wattle
  - Acacia boormanii subsp. boormanii (N.S.W., Vic.)
  - Acacia boormanii subsp. gibba (Vic.)
- Acacia botrydion (W.A.)
- Acacia brachybotrya – grey mulga, grey wattle (S.A., Vic., N.S.W.)
- Acacia brachyclada (W.A.)
- Acacia brachyphylla (W.A.)
  - Acacia brachyphylla subsp. brachyphylla
  - Acacia brachyphylla subsp. recurvata
- Acacia brachypoda – western wheatbelt wattle (W.A.)
- Acacia brachystachya – umbrella mulga, umbrella wattle, turpentine mulga, grey mulga, false bowgada (W.A., N.T., S.A., Qld., N.S.W., Vic.)
- Acacia bracteolata (W.A.)
- Acacia brassii (Qld.)
- Acacia brockii (N.T.)
- Acacia bromilowiana – Bromilow's wattle (W.A.)
- Acacia browniana – Brown's wattle (W.A.)
- Acacia brownii – heath wattle, prickly Moses (Qld., N.S.W., Vic.)
- Acacia brumalis (W.A.)
- Acacia brunioides – brown wattle (N.S.W., Qld.)
  - Acacia brunioides subsp. brunioides (N.S.W., Qld.)
  - Acacia brunioides subsp. granitica (Qld.)
- Acacia bulgaensis – Bulga wattle (N.S.W.)
- Acacia burbidgeae – Burbidge's wattle (Qld., N.S.W.)
- Acacia burdekensis (Qld.)
- Acacia burkittii – Burkitt's wattle, gunderbluey, pin bush, sandhill wattle, fine leaf jam (W.A., S.A., N.S.W.)
- Acacia burrana (Qld.)
- Acacia burrowii – Burrow's wattle (N.S.W., Qld.)
- Acacia burrowsiana – Burrows’ snakewood or gizzard wattle (W.A.)
- Acacia buxifolia – box-leaf wattle
  - Acacia buxifolia subsp. buxifolia (Qld., N.S.W., Vic.)
  - Acacia buxifolia subsp. pubiflora (Qld., N.S.W.)
- Acacia bynoeana – Bynoe's wattle, tiny wattle (N.S.W.)

== C ==
- Acacia caerulescens – limestone blue wattle, Buchan blue, Buchan blue wattle (Vic.)
- Acacia caesaneura – western blue mulga (W.A.)
- Acacia caesariata (W.A.)
- Acacia caesiella – tableland wattle, bluebush wattle, blue bush (N.S.W.)
- Acacia calamifolia – wallowa, reed-leaf wattle, willow, broom wattle, sandhill wattle, reed-leaved wattle (S.A., N.S.W.)
- Acacia calantha (Qld.)
- Acacia calcarata (W.A.)
- Acacia calcicola – shrubby wattle, shrubby mulga, myall-gidgee, northern myall, grey myall, ikatuka, jirlarti irrakwetye (W.A.., N.T., S.A., N.S.W., Qld.)
- Acacia calligera (W.A., N.T., Qld.)
- Acacia calyculata (Qld.)
- Acacia cambagei – gidgee, gidyea, gidya, gidgea, stinking wattle (N.T., S.A., Qld, N.S.W.)
- Acacia camptocarpa – Ragged Range wattle (W.A.)
- Acacia camptoclada (W.A.)
- Acacia campylophylla (W.A.)
- Acacia cana – boree, cabbage-tree wattle, broad-leaved nealie (N.S.W., Qld.)
- Acacia cangaiensis (N.S.W.)
- Acacia capillaris (W.A.)
- Acacia capillosa (Qld.)
- Acacia cardiophylla – Wyalong wattle, West Wyalong wattle, heart-leaf wattle (N.S.W.)
- Acacia carens (W.A.)
- Acacia carneorum – needle wattle, dead finish, purple-wood wattle (S.A., N.S.W.)
- Acacia carnosula (W.A.)
- Acacia caroleae – carol's wattle, carole's wattle, narrow-leaf currawong (Qld., N.S.W.)
- Acacia cassicula (W.A.)
- Acacia castanostegia (W.A.)
- Acacia castorum – Peak Range wattle (Qld.)
- Acacia cataractae (N.T.)
- Acacia catenulata
  - Acacia catenulata subsp. catenulata – bendee (Qld., N.T.)
  - Acacia catenulata subsp. occidentalis – western Bendee, black mulga (W.A.)
- Acacia cavealis (W.A.)
- Acacia cedroides (W.A.)
- Acacia celastrifolia – glowing wattle, Celastrus-leaved acacia (W.A.)
- Acacia celsa – brown salsa (Qld.)
- Acacia centrinervia – hairy white wattle (N.S.W., Qld.)
- Acacia cerastes (W.A.)
- Acacia chalkeri – Chalker's wattle (N.S.W.)
- Acacia chamaeleon (W.A.)
- Acacia chapmanii (W.A.)
  - Acacia chapmanii subsp. australis (W.A.)
  - Acacia chapmanii subsp. chapmanii (W.A.)
- Acacia chartacea (W.A.)
- Acacia cheelii – motherumbah, motherumbung (N.S.W.)
- Acacia chinchillensis – chinchilla wattle (Qld.)
- Acacia chippendalei – Chippendale's wattle (W.A., N.T., Qld.)
- Acacia chisholmii – turpentine bush, Chisholm's wattle (Qld., N.T.)
- Acacia chrysella (W.A.)
- Acacia chrysocephala (W.A.)
- Acacia chrysochaeta (W.A.)
- Acacia chrysopoda (W.A.)
- Acacia chrysotricha (N.S.W.)
- Acacia cincinnata – Daintree wattle, circle fruit salwood (Qld.)
- Acacia cineramis – grey-stem nealie (Vic.)
- Acacia citrinoviridis – river jam, milhan, wantan (W.A.)
- Acacia citriodora – lemon-scented wattle (W.A., N.T., Qld.)
- Acacia clandullensis – gold-dust wattle (N.S.W.)
- Acacia claviseta – club-tipped whorled wattle (W.A., N.T.)
- Acacia clelandii – umbrella mulga (S.A., W.A.)
- Acacia clunies-rossiae – kowmung wattle, kanangra wattle (N.S.W.)
- Acacia clydonophora (W.A.)
- Acacia coatesii (W.A.)
- Acacia cochlearis – rigid wattle (W.A.)
- Acacia cochlocarpa (W.A.)
  - Acacia cochlocarpa subsp. cochlocarpa
  - Acacia cochlocarpa subsp. velutinosa
- Acacia cockertoniana (W.A.)
- Acacia cognata – bower wattle, river wattle, narrow-leaf bower-wattle (N.S.W., Vic.)
- Acacia colei – Cole's wattle, kalkardi, candelabra wattle or soap wattle (W.A., N.T., Qld.)
  - Acacia colei var. colei (W.A., N.T., Qld.)
  - Acacia colei var. ileocarpa (W.A., N.T.)
- Acacia collegialis – southern rock wattle (W.A.)
- Acacia colletioides – wait-a-while, pin bush, spinebush (W.A., S.A., N.S.W., Vic.)
- Acacia comans (W.A.)
- Acacia complanata – flat-stemmed wattle, long-pod wattle, donkey's ears (Qld., N.S.W.)
- Acacia concolorans (W.A.)
- Acacia concurrens – curracabah, black wattle (N.S.W., Qld.)
- Acacia conferta – crowded-leaf wattle, crowded-leaved wattle (N.S.W., Qld.)
- Acacia confluens – wyrilda (S.A.)
- Acacia confusa (Borneo, Malaya, Philippines, Sumatera, Taiwan)
- Acacia congesta (W.A.)
  - Acacia congesta subsp. cliftoniana
  - Acacia congesta subsp. congesta
  - Acacia congesta subsp. wonganensis
- Acacia conjunctifolia (W.A., N.T., Qld.)
- Acacia conniana (W.A.)
- Acacia consanguinea (W.A.)
- Acacia consobrina (W.A.)
- Acacia conspersa (N.T.)
- Acacia constablei – Narrabarba wattle (N.S.W.)
- Acacia continua – thorn wattle, thorny wattle (S.A., N.S.W.)
- Acacia convallium (N.T.)
- Acacia coolgardiensis – sugar brother (W.A.)
- Acacia coriacea – wirewood, wiry wattle, desert oak (W.A.)
  - Acacia coriacea subsp. coriacea
  - Acacia coriacea subsp. pendens
- Acacia corusca – shimmer wattle (W.A.)
- Acacia costata (W.A.)
- Acacia costiniana – Costin's wattle (N.S.W.)
- Acacia courtii – Three Brothers wattle, Brother wattle, Northern Brother wattle (N.S.W.)
- Acacia covenyi – blue bush (N.S.W.)
- Acacia cowaniana – Cowan's wattle (W.A.)
- Acacia cowleana – Halls Creek wattle (W.A., N.T., Qld., N.S.W.)
- Acacia cracentis (W.A.)
- Acacia craspedocarpa – hop mulga, broad-leaved mulga (W.A.)
- Acacia crassa – curracabah (Qld., N.S.W.)
  - Acacia crassa subsp. crassa (Qld., N.S.W.)
  - Acacia crassa subsp. longicoma (Qld.)
- Acacia crassicarpa – thick-podded salwood, lancewood, northern golden wattle, northern wattle (Qld., New Guinea)
- Acacia crassistipula (W.A.)
- Acacia crassiuscula (W.A.)
- Acacia crassuloides (W.A.)
- Acacia cremiflora (N.S.W.)
- Acacia crenulata (W.A.)
- Acacia cretacea – chalky wattle (S.A.)
- Acacia cretata (Qld.)
- Acacia crispula (W.A.)
- Acacia crombiei – pink gidgee (Qld.)
- Acacia cultriformis – knife-leaf wattle, dogtooth wattle, half-moon wattle, golden-glow wattle (N.S.W., Qld.)
- Acacia cummingiana (W.A.)
- Acacia cuneifolia (W.A.)
- Acacia cupularis – coastal umbrella bush (W.A., S.A., Vic.)
- Acacia curranii – curly-bark wattle, Curran's wattle (Qld., N.S.W.)
- Acacia curryana – Suzanne’s golden-pod wattle (W.A.)
- Acacia curvata (W.A.)
- Acacia cuspidifolia – wait-a-while, bohemia (W.A.)
- Acacia cuthbertsonii – silver witchetty, pirli (W.A., N.T.)
  - Acacia cuthbertsonii subsp. cuthbertsonii (W.A., N.T.)
  - Acacia cuthbertsonii subsp. linearis (W.A.)
- Acacia cyclocarpa – ring-pod minni-ritchi (W.A.)
- Acacia cyclops – coastal wattle, cyclops wattle, one-eyed wattle, red-eyed wattle, redwreath acacia, western coastal wattle (W.A., S.A.)
- Acacia cylindrica (W.A.)
- Acacia cyperophylla – creekline miniritchie, red mulga, mineritchie (W.A., S.A., N.T., Qld.)

== D ==
- Acacia dacrydioides (W.A.)
- Acacia dallachiana – catkin wattle (Vic., N.S.W.)
- Acacia dangarensis – Mount Dangar wattle (N.S.W.)
- Acacia daphnifolia (W.A.)
- Acacia daviesii – Timbertop wattle (Vic.)
- Acacia daviesioides (W.A.)
- Acacia daweana – Dawe's wattle (W.A.)
- Acacia dawsonii – poverty wattle, Dawson's wattle, mitta wattle (N.S.W., A.C.T., Qld. Vic.)
- Acacia dealbata – silver wattle, blue wattle, mimosa (N.S.W., A.C.T., Vic., Tas.)
  - Acacia dealbata subsp. dealbata (N.S.W., A.C.T., Vic., Tas.)
  - Acacia dealbata subsp. subalpina (N.S.W., Vic.)
- Acacia deanei – green wattle, Deane's wattle (Qld., N.S.W., Vic.)
  - Acacia deanei subsp. deanei
  - Acacia deanei subsp. paucijuga
- Acacia debilis – spindly wattle (Qld., N.S.W.)
- Acacia declinata (W.A.)
- Acacia decora – western silver wattle, showy wattle etc. (Qld., N.S.W., Vic.)
- Acacia decurrens – black wattle, Sydney green wattle, early green wattle etc. (N.S.W.)
- Acacia deficiens (W.A.)
- Acacia deflexa (W.A.)
- Acacia delibrata (W.A.)
- Acacia delicatula (W.A., N.T.)
- Acacia delphina (W.A.)
- Acacia deltoidea (W.A.)
  - Acacia deltoidea subsp. ampla
  - Acacia deltoidea subsp. deltoidea
- Acacia demissa (W.A.)
- Acacia dempsteri (W.A.)
- Acacia densiflora (W.A.)
- Acacia denticulosa – sandpaper wattle (W.A.)
- Acacia dentifera – tooth-bearing acacia (W.A.)
- Acacia depressa – echidna wattle (W.A.)
- Acacia dermatophylla (W.A.)
- Acacia derwentiana – Derwent cascade, Derwent wattle (TAS.)
- Acacia desertorum (W.A.)
- Acacia desmondii – Des Nelson wattle (N.T.)
- Acacia deuteroneura (Qld.)
- Acacia diallaga (W.A.)
- Acacia diaphana (W.A.)
- Acacia diaphyllodinea (W.A.)
- Acacia diastemata – sandstone pavement wattle (W.A.)
- Acacia dichromotricha (Qld.)
- Acacia dictyocarpa (S.A., Vic.)
- Acacia dictyoneura (W.A.)
- Acacia dictyophleba – sandhill wattle, waxy wattle, feather veined wattle, spear tree (W.A., N.T., S.A. Qld.)
- Acacia didyma (W.A.)
- Acacia dielsii (W.A.)
- Acacia dietrichiana (Qld.)
- Acacia difficilis – river wattle (N.T., W.A., Qld.)
- Acacia difformis – drooping wattle, Wyalong wattle, mystery wattle (N.S.W., Vic.)
- Acacia dilatata (W.A.)
- Acacia dilloniorum – Wilgie Mia wattle (W.A.)
- Acacia dimidiata – swamp wattle (N.T., Qld.)
- Acacia diminuta (W.A.)
- Acacia dimorpha – Artesian Range whorled wattle (W.A.)
- Acacia disparrima (Qld., N.S.W.)
  - Acacia disparrima subsp. calidestris – dry-land salwood (Qld.)
  - Acacia disparrima subsp. disparrmia – salwood, southern salwood, brush ironbark wattle, hickory (Qld., N.S.W.)
- Acacia dissimilis – Mitchell Plateau wattle (W.A.)
- Acacia dissona (W.A.)
  - Acacia dissona var. dissona
  - Acacia dissona var. indoloria
- Acacia distans – manggurda wattle (W.A.)
- Acacia disticha (W.A.)
- Acacia divergens (W.A.)
- Acacia dodonaeifolia – sticky wattle, hop-leaved wattle (S.A., Vic.)
- Acacia dolichophylla – Chewings Range wattle (N.T.)
- Acacia donaldsonii – Binneringie wattle (W.A.)
- Acacia doratoxylon – currawang, lancewood, spearwood, coast myall etc. (N.S.W., Vic.)
- Acacia doreta – Vollies’ minni ritchi (W.A., N.T., S.A.)
- Acacia dorothea – Dorothy's wattle (N.S.W.)
- Acacia dorsenna (W.A.)
- Acacia drepanocarpa (W.A., N.T., Qld.)
  - Acacia drepanocarpa subsp. drepanocarpa
  - Acacia drepanocarpa subsp. latifolia
- Acacia drepanophylla (W.A.)
- Acacia drewiana (W.A.)
  - Acacia drewiana subsp. drewiana
  - Acacia drewiana subsp. minor
- Acacia drummondii – Drummond's wattle (W.A.)
  - Acacia drummondii subsp. affinis
  - Acacia drummondii subsp. candolleana
  - Acacia drummondii subsp. drummondii
  - Acacia drummondii subsp. elegans
- Acacia dunnii – Dunn's wattle, elephant (W.A., N.T.)
- Acacia dura (W.A.)
- Acacia durabilis (W.A.)
- Acacia duriuscula (W.A.)

== E ==
- Acacia echinula – hedgehog wattle (N.S.W.)
- Acacia echinuliflora (N.T.)
- Acacia effusa – Punurunha minni ritchi (W.A.)
- Acacia effusifolia (W.A.)
- Acacia elachantha (W.A., N.T., S.A., Qld.)
- Acacia elata – cedar wattle, mountain cedar wattle (N.S.W.)
- Acacia elongata – swamp wattle , slender wattle (N.S.W.)
- Acacia empelioclada (W.A.)
- Acacia enervia (W.A.)
  - Acacia enervia subsp. enervia
  - Acacia enervia subsp. explicata
- Acacia ensifolia (Qld.)
- Acacia enterocarpa – jumping-jack wattle (Vic., S.A.)
- Acacia epacantha (W.A.)
- Acacia epedunculata (W.A.)
- Acacia ephedroides (W.A.)
- Acacia equisetifolia (N.T.)
- Acacia eremaea (W.A.)
- Acacia eremophila (W.A.)
  - Acacia eremophila subsp. eremophila
  - Acacia eremophila subsp. variabilis
- Acacia eremophiloides (Qld.)
- Acacia ericifolia (W.A.)
- Acacia ericksoniae (W.A.)
- Acacia erinacea (W.A., S.A.)
- Acacia erioclada (W.A.)
- Acacia eriopoda – Broome pindan wattle, narrow-leaf pindan wattle, yirrakulu (W.A.)
- Acacia errabunda (W.A.)
- Acacia estrophiolata – ironwood, southern ironwood, desert ironwood, utjanypa (N.T., S.A., W.A.)
- Acacia euthycarpa (S.A., Vic.)
  - Acacia euthycarpa subsp. euthycarpa
  - Acacia euthycarpa subsp. oblanceolata
- Acacia euthyphylla (W.A.)
- Acacia evenulosa (W.A.)
- Acacia everistii (Qld.)
- Acacia excelsa – ironwood, rosewood, doodlallie, bunkerman (Qld., N.S.W.)
  - Acacia excelsa subsp. angusta
  - Acacia excelsa subsp. excelsa
- Acacia excentrica (W.A.)
- Acacia exigua – muntalkura wattle (W.A.)
- Acacia exocarpoides (W.A.)
- Acacia extensa – wiry wattle (W.A.)
- Acacia exudans – Casterton wattle (Vic.)

== F ==
- Acacia fagonioides (W.A.)
- Acacia falcata – burra, sickle-shaped acacia, sally, hickory wattle or silver-leaved wattle (N.S.W., Qld.)
- Acacia falciformis – mountain hickory, broad-leaved hickory, hickory wattle, black wattle, tanning wattle, large-leaf hickory wattle (N.S.W., Vic., ACT, Qld.)
- Acacia farinosa – mealy wattle (S.A., Vic.)
- Acacia fasciculifera – scrub ironbark, rosewood, rose wattle, scaly bark (Qld.)
- Acacia faucium (Qld.)
- Acacia fauntleroyi (W.A.)
- Acacia fecunda – Mosquito Creek wattle (W.A.)
- Acacia ferocior (W.A.)
- Acacia filamentosa (W.A.)
- Acacia filicifolia – fern-leaved wattle (N.S.W., Qld.)
- Acacia filifolia (W.A.)
- Acacia filipes (N.T.)
- Acacia fimbriata – fringed wattle, Brisbane golden wattle, Brisbane wattle (Qld., N.S.W.)
- Acacia flabellifolia (W.A.)
- Acacia flagelliformis (W.A.)
- Acacia flavescens – red wattle, yellow wattle (Qld.)
- Acacia flavipila (W.A.)
- Acacia fleckeri (Qld.)
- Acacia flexifolia – bent-leaf wattle, bent-leaved wattle, small winter wattle (Qld., N.S.W., Vic.)
- Acacia flocktoniae – Flockton wattle (N.S.W.)
- Acacia floribunda – white sally wattle, gossamer wattle, river wattle, white-sallow wattle (Qld., N.S.W., Vic.)
- Acacia floydii (N.S.W.)
- Acacia fodinalis (Qld.)
- Acacia formidabilis (W.A.)
- Acacia forrestiana – Forrest's wattle (W.A.)
- Acacia forsteri – Forster's wattle (Qld.)
- Acacia forsythii – Warrumbungle Range wattle (N.S.W.)
- Acacia fragilis (W.A.)
- Acacia fraternalis – Maz's myall (W.A.)
- Acacia frigescens – montane wattle, frosted wattle, forest wattle (Vic.)
- Acacia froggattii (W.A., N.T.)
- Acacia fulva – velvet wattle, soft wattle (N.S.W.)
- Acacia fuscaneura – sooty wattle (W.A.)

== G ==
- Acacia galeata (W.A.)
- Acacia galioides (W.A., N.T., Qld.)
- Acacia gardneri (W.A.)
- Acacia gelasina (W.A.)
- Acacia gemina (W.A.)
- Acacia genistifolia – spreading wattle, early wattle (N.S.W., A.C.T., Vic., S.A., Tas.)
- Acacia georgensis – Bega wattle, Dr George Mountain wattle, Dr George wattle (N.S.W.)
- Acacia georginae – Georgina gidgee, Georgina gidyea, poison gidyea (N.T., Qld., S.A.)
- Acacia gibbosa (W.A.)
- Acacia gibsonii – Gibson's wattle (W.A.)
- Acacia gilbertii (W.A.)
- Acacia gilesiana – Giles' wattle (W.A., S.A.)
- Acacia gillii – Gill's wattle (S.A.)
- Acacia gittinsii (Qld.)
- Acacia gladiiformis – sword wattle, sword-leaf wattle (N.S.W., Qld.)
- Acacia glandulicarpa – hairy-pod wattle (S.A., Vic.)
- Acacia glaucissima (W.A.)
- Acacia glaucocaesia (W.A.)
- Acacia glaucocarpa – hickory wattle, glory wattle (Qld.)
- Acacia glaucoptera – clay wattle, flat wattle, claybush wattle (W.A.)
- Acacia gloeotricha (W.A.)
- Acacia glutinosissima (W.A.)
- Acacia gnidium (Qld.)
- Acacia gonocarpa – wuluru (W.A., N.T.)
- Acacia gonoclada – ganambureng (W.A., S.A., Qld.)
- Acacia gonophylla (W.A.)
- Acacia gordonii – Gordon's wattle (N.S.W.)
- Acacia gracilenta (N.T.)
- Acacia gracilifolia – graceful wattle (S.A.)
- Acacia graciliformis – Koolanooka delicate wattle (W.A.)
- Acacia grandifolia (Qld.)
- Acacia granitica – granite wattle (N.S.W., Qld.)
- Acacia graniticola (W.A.)
- Acacia grasbyi – miniritchie (W.A., S.A., N.T.)
- Acacia gregorii – Gregory's wattle (W.A.)
- Acacia grisea (W.A.)
- Acacia guinetii – Guinet's wattle (W.A.)
- Acacia gunnii – ploughshare wattle, dog's tooth wattle (N.S.W., Qld., Vic., S.A., Tas.)
- Acacia guymeri (Qld.)

== H ==
- Acacia hadrophylla (W.A.)
- Acacia haematites – Koolyanobbing ironstone wattle (W.A.)
- Acacia hakeoides – hakea wattle, hakea-leaved wattle, western black wattle (N.S.W., Vic., S.A., W.A., Qld.)
- Acacia halliana (N.S.W., Vic., S.A.)
- Acacia hamersleyensis – Karijini wattle, Hamersley Range wattle (W.A.)
- Acacia hamiltoniana – Hamilton's wattle (N.S.W.)
- Acacia hammondii – Hammond's wattle (W.A., N.T., Qld.)
- Acacia handonis – Hando's wattle, Percy Grant wattle (Qld.)
- Acacia harpophylla – brigalow, brigalow spearwood, orkor, ogarah (N.S.W., Qld.)
- Acacia harveyi (W.A.)
- Acacia hastulata (W.A.)
- Acacia havilandiorum – Haviland's wattle, needle wattle (N.S.W., S.A., Vic.)
- Acacia helicophylla (N.T.)
- Acacia helmsiana (W.A., N.T., S.A.)
- Acacia hemignosta – clubleaf wattle (W.A., N.T., Qld.)
- Acacia hemiteles – tan wattle, broombush (W.A., S.A.)
- Acacia hemsleyi (W.A., N.T., Qld.)
- Acacia hendersonii (Qld.)
- Acacia heterochroa (W.A.)
  - Acacia heterochroa subsp. heterochroa
  - Acacia heterochroa subsp. robertii
- Acacia heteroclita (W.A.)
  - Acacia heteroclita subsp. heteroclita
  - Acacia heteroclita subsp. valida
- Acacia heteroneura (W.A.)
- Acacia heterophylla – highland tamarind (Hawaii, Mauritius, Réunion)
- Acacia hexaneura – Cowell spine-bush (S.A.)
- Acacia hierochoensis (Qld.)
- Acacia hilliana – Hill's tabletop wattle, sandhill wattle, Hilltop wattle, flying saucer bush (W.A., N.T., Qld.)
- Acacia hippuroides (W.A.)
- Acacia hispidula – little harsh acacia, rough-leaved acacia, rough hairy wattle (N.S.W., Qld.)
- Acacia hockingsii – Hocking's wattle (Qld.)
- Acacia holosericea – candelabra wattle, soapbush, silver wattle, silver-leaved wattle, silky wattle (W.A.,N.T.,Qld.)
- Acacia holotricha (Qld.)
- Acacia homaloclada (Qld.)
- Acacia hopperiana (W.A.)
- Acacia horridula (W.A.)
- Acacia howittii – sticky wattle, Howitt's wattle (Vic.)
- Acacia hubbardiana – yellow prickly Moses, prickly Moses (Qld.)
- Acacia huegelii – Huegel's wattle (W.A.)
- Acacia humifusa (W.A., N.T., Qld.)
- Acacia hyaloneura (Qld., N.T.)
- Acacia hylonoma – Yarrabah wattle (Qld.)
- Acacia hypermeces (W.A.)
- Acacia hystrix (W.A.)
  - Acacia hystrix subsp. continua
  - Acacia hystrix subsp. hystrix

== I ==
- Acacia idiomorpha (W.A.)
- Acacia imbricata – imbricate wattle (S.A.)
- Acacia imitans – Gibson wattle (W.A.)
- Acacia imparilis (W.A.)
- Acacia implexa – lightwood, hickory wattle (Qld., N.S.W., Vic., Tas.)
- Acacia improcera (W.A.)
- Acacia inaequilatera – kanji bush, baderi, camel bush, fire wattle, kanyji bush or ranji bush (W.A., N.T., S.A.)
- Acacia inaequiloba (W.A.)
- Acacia inamabilis (W.A.)
- Acacia incanicarpa (W.A.)
- Acacia inceana (W.A.)
  - Acacia inceana subsp. conformis
  - Acacia inceana subsp. inceana
  - Acacia inceana subsp. latifolia
- Acacia incognita – false sugar brother (W.A.)
- Acacia incongesta – Peak Charles wattle (W.A.)
- Acacia incrassata (W.A.)
- Acacia incurva (W.A.)
- Acacia incurvaneura – narrow-leaf wattle (W.A., S.A., N.T.)
- Acacia infecunda – famine wattle (Vic.)
- Acacia ingramii – Ingram's wattle (N.S.W.)
- Acacia ingrata (W.A.)
- Acacia inophloia – fibre-barked wattle (N.S.W., Qld.)
- Acacia inops (W.A.)
- Acacia insolita (W.A.)
  - Acacia insolita subsp. insolita
  - Acacia insolita subsp. recurva
- Acacia intorta (W.A.)
- Acacia intricata (W.A.)
- Acacia irrorata – green wattle, blueskin (N.S.W., Qld.)
  - Acacia irrorata subsp. irrorata
  - Acacia irrorata subsp. velutinella
- Acacia islana (Qld.)
- Acacia isoneura (W.A.)
  - Acacia isoneura subsp. isoneura
  - Acacia isoneura subsp. nimia
- Acacia iteaphylla – Flinders Range wattle, Port Lincoln wattle, winter wattle, willow-leaved wattle (S.A.)
- Acacia ixiophylla – umbrella wattle, sticky leaved wattle (N.S.W., Qld.)
- Acacia ixodes – motherumbung (N.S.W., Qld.)

== J ==
- Acacia jackesiana – Betsy's wattle (Qld.)
- Acacia jacksonioides (W.A.)
- Acacia jamesiana (W.A.)
- Acacia jasperensis (N.T., W.A.)
- Acacia jennerae – Coonavittra wattle (W.A., N.T., S.A., Qld., N.S.W.)
- Acacia jensenii (W.A., N.T.)
- Acacia jibberdingensis – Jibberding wattle, willow-leafed wattle (W.A.)
- Acacia johannis (Qld.)
- Acacia johnsonii – gereera wattle, geereva wattle, Johnson's wattle (Qld., N.S.W.)
- Acacia jonesii (N.S.W.)
- Acacia jucunda – Glenmorgan wattle, Yetman wattle (Qld., N.S.W.)
- Acacia julifera (Qld.)
  - Acacia julifera subsp. curvinervia
  - Acacia julifera subsp. gilbertensis
  - Acacia julifera subsp. julifera
- Acacia juncifolia – rush-leaf wattle (Qld., N.S.W.)

== K ==
- Acacia kalgoorliensis – Kalgoorlie wattle (W.A.)
- Acacia karina – Karina's wattle (W.A.)
- Acacia keigheryi – Keighery's wattle (W.A.)
- Acacia kelleri (W.A., N.T.)
- Acacia kempeana – wanderrie wattle, witchetty bush, granite wattle (W.A., N.T., S.A.)
- Acacia kenneallyi (W.A.)
- Acacia kerryana (W.A.)
- Acacia kettlewelliae – buffalo wattle (N.S.W., Vic.)
- Acacia kimberleyensis (W.A.)
- Acacia kingiana (W.A.)
- Acacia koa – koa (Hawaii)
- Acacia kochii (W.A.)
- Acacia kulinensis – Kulin wattle (W.A.)
- Acacia kulnurensis – Kulnura wattle (N.S.W.)
- Acacia kybeanensis – kybean wattle, kybeyan wattle (N.S.W., Vic.)
- Acacia kydrensis – Kydra wattle (N.S.W.)

== L ==
- Acacia laccata (W.A., N.T., Qld.)
- Acacia lacertensis (N.T.)
- Acacia lachnocarpa – woolly-fruited wattle (W.A.)
- Acacia lachnophylla (W.A.)
- Acacia lamprocarpa – western salwood (W.A., N.T., Qld.)
- Acacia lanceolata (W.A.)
- Acacia lanei – Hyden wattle (W.A.)
- Acacia lanigera – woolly wattle, hairy wattle (N.S.W., A.C.T., Vic.)
  - Acacia lanigera var. gracilipes
  - Acacia lanigera var. lanigera
  - Acacia lanigera var. whanii
- Acacia lanuginophylla – woolly wattle (W.A.)
- Acacia lapidosa – Mount Magnet rock wattle (W.A.)
- Acacia laricina (W.A.)
  - Acacia laricina var. crassifolia
  - Acacia laricina var. laricina
- Acacia lasiocalyx – silver wattle, wilyurwur (W.A.)
- Acacia lasiocarpa – dune Moses, panjang or pajang (W.A.)
  - Acacia lasiocarpa var. bracteolata
  - Acacia lasiocarpa var. lasiocarpa
  - Acacia lasiocarpa var. sedifolia
- Acacia lateriticola (W.A.)
- Acacia latescens – ball wattle (N.T.)
- Acacia latifolia (N.T., W.A., Qld.)
- Acacia latior – broad-leaf sugar brother (W.A.)
- Acacia latipes (W.A.)
  - Acacia latipes subsp. latipes
  - Acacia latipes subsp. licina
- Acacia latisepala (Qld., N.S.W.)
- Acacia latzii – Latz's wattle, Tjilpi wattle (N.T., S.A.)
- Acacia lauta – Tara wattle (Qld.)
- Acacia lazaridis (Qld.)
- Acacia leeuweniana – Leeuwen's wattle or Spear Hill wattle (W.A.)
- Acacia legnota (Qld.)
- Acacia leichhardtii – Leichhardt's wattle (Qld.)
- Acacia leiocalyx blackwattle, early black wattle, early flowering black wattle, lamb's tail wattle, curracabah (Qld., N.S.W.)
  - Acacia leiocalyx subsp. herveyensis (Qld.)
  - Acacia leiocalyx subsp. leiocalyx (Qld., N.S.W.)
- Acacia leioderma (W.A.)
- Acacia leiophylla (S.A.)
- Acacia lentiginea (W.A.)
- Acacia leprosa (Vic., Qld., N.S.W., Tas., W.A.)
  - Acacia leprosa var. crassipoda (Vic.)
  - Acacia leprosa var. graveolens (Qld., N.S.W., Vic., Tas.)
  - Acacia leprosa var. leprosa (Qld., N.S.W.)
  - Acacia leprosa var. magna (Vic.)
  - Acacia leprosa var. uninervia (N.S.W., Vic.)
- Acacia leptalea – Chinocup wattle (W.A.)
- Acacia leptocarpa – slender-fruited wattle,mangarr mangal, malakmalak, matngala, wagiman (Qld., N.T., W.A.)
- Acacia leptoclada – sharp feather wattle (N.S.W.)
- Acacia leptoloba – Irvinebank wattle (Qld.)
- Acacia leptoneura – slender-nerved acacia (W.A.)
- Acacia leptopetala (W.A.)
- Acacia leptophleba (W.A., N.T.)
- Acacia leptospermoides (W.A.)
  - Acacia leptospermoides subsp. leptospermoides
  - Acacia leptospermoides subsp. obovata
  - Acacia leptospermoides subsp. psammophila
- Acacia leptostachya – Townsville wattle, slender wattle (Qld.)
- Acacia lespedleyi – Les Pedley's wattle (Qld.)
- Acacia leucoclada – northern silver wattle
  - Acacia leucoclada subsp. argentifolia (Qld., N.S.W.)
  - Acacia leucoclada subsp. leucoclada (N.S.W.)
- Acacia leucolobia (N.S.W.)
- Acacia levata – woodstock wattle (W.A.)
- Acacia ligulata – sandhill wattle, umbrella bush, marpoo, dune wattle, small coobah, wirra, watarrka (W.A., N.T., S.A., Qld., N.S.W., Vic.)
- Acacia ligustrina (W.A.)
- Acacia limbata (W.A., N.T., Qld.)
- Acacia linarioides (N.T.)
- Acacia linearifolia – stringybark wattle, narrow-leaved wattle (N.S.W., Vic.)
- Acacia lineata – streaked wattle, narrow lined-leaved wattle (S.A., Vic., N.S.W., Qld.)
- Acacia lineolata – dwarf myall (W.A.)
  - Acacia lineolata subsp. lineolata
  - Acacia lineolata subsp. multilineata
- Acacia linifolia – white wattle, flax-leaved wattle (N.S.W.)
- Acacia lirellata (W.A.)
  - Acacia lirellata subsp. compressa
  - Acacia lirellata subsp. lirellata
- Acacia lithgowiae – Lithgow's wattle (Qld.)
- Acacia lobulata – Chiddarcooping wattle (W.A.)
- Acacia loderi – nealie, nelia, Broken Hill gidgee, myall (N.S.W., Vic., S.A.)
- Acacia longifolia – Sydney golden wattle, sallow wattle (Qld., N.S.W., Vic., S.A., Tas.)
  - Acacia longifolia subsp. longifolia
  - Acacia longifolia subsp. sophorae
- Acacia longipedunculata (Qld., N.T.)
- Acacia longiphyllodinea – yalgoo, long-leaved wattle (W.A.)
- Acacia longispicata – long-spike wattle (Qld.)
- Acacia longispinea (W.A.)
- Acacia longissima – narrow-leaf wattle, narrow-leaved wattle, long-leaf wattle (Qld.,N.S.W.)
- Acacia loroloba – Ma Ma Creek wattle (Qld.)
- Acacia loxophylla (W.A.)
- Acacia lucasii – woolly-bear wattle, Lucas's wattle (N.S.W., Vic.)
- Acacia lucens (Madagascar)
- Acacia lullfitziorum (W.A.)
- Acacia lumholtzii – Girringun wattle (Qld.)
- Acacia lunata – lunate-leaved acacia (N.S.W.)
- Acacia luteola (W.A.)
- Acacia lycopodiifolia (W.A., N.T.)
- Acacia lysiphloia – turpentine, turpentine bush, turpentine wattle (W.A., N.T., Qld.)

== M ==
- Acacia mabellae – Mabels's wattle or black wattle (N.S.W.)
- Acacia macdonnelliensis – MacDonnell mulga, Hill mulga (N.T., W.A.)
  - Acacia macdonnelliensis subsp. macdonnelliensis
  - Acacia macdonnelliensis subsp. teretifolia
- Acacia mackenziei – Norm's whorled wattle (W.A.)
- Acacia mackeyana (W.A.)
- Acacia macnuttiana – McNutt's wattle (N.S.W.)
- Acacia maconochieana – Mullan wattle, salt wattle (W.A., N.T.)
- Acacia macradenia – zig-zag wattle (Qld.)
- Acacia macraneura – big pod mulga, big mac mulga (W.A., S.A.)
- Acacia maidenii – Maiden's wattle (Qld, N.S.W., Vic.)
- Acacia maitlandii – Maitland's wattle, spiky wattle, spiny-leaved wattle, garrga, jumbingjar (W.A., N.T., S.A., Qld., N.S.W.)
- Acacia malloclada ("North Australia")
- Acacia mangium – mangium, hickory wattle, black wattle (Qld., P.N.G., Maluku)
- Acacia manipularis (W.A., N.T.)
- Acacia maranoensis – womel (Qld.)
- Acacia mariae – golden-top wattle, crowned wattle (N.S.W.)
- Acacia marramamba – marramamba (W.A.)
- Acacia masliniana – Maslin's wattle (W.A.)
- Acacia mathuataensis (Fiji)
- Acacia matthewii – Matthew's wattle (N.S.W.)
- Acacia maxwellii (W.A.)
- Acacia mearnsii – black wattle, late black wattle, green wattle (N.S.W., Vic., S.A., Tas.)
- Acacia megacephala (W.A.)
- Acacia megalantha (W.A., N.T., Qld.)
- Acacia meiantha – barradam-bang wattle (N.S.W.)
- Acacia meiosperma (Qld.)
- Acacia meisneri (W.A.)
- Acacia melanoxylon – blackwood, Tasmanian blackwood, hickory, sally wattle, black sally, mudgerabah (Qld., N.S.W., Vic., S.A., Tas.)
- Acacia melleodora – scented wax wattle, waxy wattle, honey wattle (W.A., N.T., S.A., Qld.)
- Acacia melvillei – yarran, myall (Qld., N.S.W., Vic.)
- Acacia menzelii – Menzel's wattle (S.A.)
- Acacia merinthophora – zig-zag wattle (W.A.)
- Acacia merrallii – Merrall's wattle (W.A., S.A.)
- Acacia merrickiae – Merrick's wattle (W.A.)
- Acacia microbotrya – manna wattle (W.A.)
- Acacia microcalyx (W.A.)
- Acacia microcarpa – manna wattle (S.A., Vic., N.S.W.)
- Acacia microcybe (Qld.)
- Acacia microneura (W.A.)
- Acacia microsperma – bowyakka (Qld.)
- Acacia midgleyi – Cape York salwood (Qld.)
- Acacia mimica (W.A.)
  - Acacia mimica var. angusta
  - Acacia mimica var. mimica
- Acacia mimula (N.T.)
- Acacia minniritchi (W.A.)
- Acacia minutifolia – small-leaved flying-saucer bush (N.T., W.A.)
- Acacia minutissima (W.A.)
- Acacia minyura – desert mulga, shrubby desert mulga, minyura, kitir-kitir, puyukara (W.A., N.T., S.A., Qld.)
- Acacia mitchellii – Mitchell's wattle (Vic., N.S.W., S.A.)
- Acacia mitodes (W.A.)
- Acacia moirii – Moir's wattle (W.A.)
  - Acacia moirii subsp. dasycarpa
  - Acacia moirii subsp. moirii
  - Acacia moirii subsp. recurvistipula
- Acacia mollifolia – hairy silver wattle, velvet acacia, hoary silver wattle (N.S.W.)
- Acacia montana – mallee wattle (Qld., N.S.W., Vic., S.A.)
- Acacia monticola – curley-bark wattle, Minni ritchi, red wattle, curley-bark tree, hill turpentine, gawar (W.A., N.T., Qld.)
- Acacia mooreana (W.A.)
- Acacia mountfordiae – Mountford's wattle (N.T.)
- Acacia mucronata – variable sallow wattle, variable sally, narrow-leaf wattle, caterpillar wattle
  - Acacia mucronata subsp. dependens (Tas.)
  - Acacia mucronata subsp. longifolia (N.S.W., Vic., Tas.)
  - Acacia mucronata subsp. mucronata (Tas.)
- Acacia muelleriana – Mueller's wattle (Qld., N.S.W.)
- Acacia mulganeura – milky mulga, hilltop mulga (W.A., N.T., S.A.)
- Acacia multisiliqua (W.A., N.T., Qld.)
- Acacia multispicata (W.A.)
- Acacia multistipulosa (N.T.)
- Acacia muriculata – Koolanooka wattle (W.A.)
- Acacia murrayana – Murray's wattle, sandplain wattle, colony wattle, powder bark wattle, fire wattle (W.A., N.T., S.A., Qld., N.S.W.)
- Acacia mutabilis (W.A.)
  - Acacia mutabilis subsp. angustifolia
  - Acacia mutabilis subsp. incurva
  - Acacia mutabilis subsp. mutabilis
  - Acacia mutabilis subsp. stipulifera
- Acacia myrtifolia – myrtle wattle, red stem wattle, red-stemmed wattle, South Australian silver wattle (W.A., S.A., Qld., N.S.W., Vic., Tas.)

== N ==
- Acacia nanodealbata – dwarf silver-wattle (Vic.)
- Acacia nanopravissima – little kooka wattle (Vic.)
- Acacia nematophylla – coast wallowa (S.A.)
- Acacia neobrachycarpa (Qld.)
- Acacia neorigida (W.A.)
- Acacia neriifolia – oleander wattle, silver wattle, black wattle, pechy wattle, bastard yarran (Qld., N.S.W.)
- Acacia nervosa – rib wattle, ribbed wattle (W.A.)
- Acacia nesophila (Qld.)
- Acacia neurocarpa (W.A., N.T., Qld.)
- Acacia neurophylla (W.A.)
  - Acacia neurophylla subsp. erugata
  - Acacia neurophylla subsp. neurophylla
- Acacia newbeyi (W.A.)
- Acacia nicholsonensis (N.T.)
- Acacia nigricans (W.A.)
- Acacia nigripilosa (W.A.)
  - Acacia nigripilosa subsp. latifolia
  - Acacia nigripilosa subsp. nigripilosa
- Acacia nitidula (W.A.)
- Acacia nivea (W.A.)
- Acacia nodiflora (W.A.)
- Acacia notabilis – notable wattle, mallee golden wattle, Flinders wattle, stiff golden wattle (S.A., N.S.W., Vic.)
- Acacia nuperrima (W.A., N.T., Qld.)
- Acacia nyssophylla – pin bush, wait a while, spine bush (W.A., N.T., S.A., Vic., N.S.W.)

== O ==
- Acacia obesa (W.A.)
- Acacia obliquinervia – mountain hickory, mountain hickory wattle (N.S.W., Vic.)
- Acacia obovata (W.A.)
- Acacia obtecta (W.A.)
- Acacia obtriangularis – Lawley River wattle (W.A.)
- Acacia obtusata – blunt-leaf wattle, obtuse wattle (N.S.W.)
- Acacia obtusifolia – blunt-leaf wattle, stiff-leaf wattle (Qld., N.S.W., Vic.)
- Acacia octonervia (W.A.)
- Acacia oldfieldii (W.A.)
- Acacia olgana – Mount Olga wattle, Kata Tjuta wattle (N.T., S.A.)
- Acacia oligoneura (W.A., N.T.)
- Acacia olsenii (N.S.W.)
- Acacia omalophylla = Acacia homalophylla – yarrany, yarran, gidgee (Qld., N.S.W., Vic.)
- Acacia ommatosperma (Qld.)
- Acacia oncinocarpa (N.T., W.A.)
- Acacia oncinophylla – hook-leaved acacia (W.A.)
  - Acacia oncinophylla subsp. oncinophylla
  - Acacia oncinophylla subsp. patulifolia
- Acacia ophiolithica (W.A.)
- Acacia oraria – coastal wattle (Qld, Flores, Timor)
- Acacia orbifolia (W.A.)
- Acacia orites – mountain wattle (N.S.W., Qld.)
- Acacia orthocarpa – Pilbara weeping wattle, needle-leaf wattle, straight-podded wattle (W.A., N.T., Qld.)
- Acacia orthotricha (W.A., N.T.)
- Acacia orthotropica – Mount Trafalgar wattle (W.A.)
- Acacia oshanesii – corkwood wattle, irish wattle, silver wattle, feather wattle (Qld., N.S.W.)
- Acacia oswaldii – umbrella wattle, umbrella bush, miljee, nelia, middia, curly yarran, whyacka, ram's horn wattle (etc.) (W.A., N.T., S.A., Qld., N.S.W., Vic.)
- Acacia oxycedrus – spike wattle (S.A., Vic., N.S.W.)
- Acacia oxyclada (W.A.)

== P ==
- Acacia pachyacra (W.A., N.T., S.A.)
- Acacia pachycarpa (W.A., N.T.)
- Acacia pachyphylla (W.A.)
- Acacia pachypoda
- Acacia palustris
- Acacia papulosa
- Acacia papyrocarpa
- Acacia paradoxa – kangaroo thorn
- Acacia paraneura
- Acacia parkerae
- Acacia parramattensis
- Acacia parvifoliolata
- Acacia parvipinnula
- Acacia pataczekii
- Acacia patagiata
- Acacia paula
- Acacia pedina
- Acacia pedleyi
- Acacia pellita
- Acacia pelophila
- Acacia pendula
- Acacia penninervis
- Acacia pentadenia
  - Acacia pentadenia subsp. pentadenia
  - Acacia pentadenia subsp. syntoma
- Acacia peregrinalis (New Guinea)
- Acacia perpusilla
- Acacia perryi
- Acacia petraea
- Acacia petricola
- Acacia peuce
- Acacia phacelia
- Acacia phaeocalyx
- Acacia pharangites
- Acacia phasmoides
- Acacia phlebocarpa
- Acacia phlebopetala
- Acacia phlebophylla
- Acacia pickardii
- Acacia piligera
- Acacia pilligaensis
- Acacia pinguiculosa
  - Acacia pinguiculosa subsp. pinguiculosa
  - Acacia pinguiculosa subsp. teretifolia
- Acacia pinguifolia
- Acacia platycarpa
- Acacia plautella
- Acacia plectocarpa
  - Acacia plectocarpa subsp. plectocarpa
  - Acacia plectocarpa subsp. tanumbirinensis
- Acacia plicata
- Acacia podalyriifolia
- Acacia polifolia
- Acacia poliochroa
- Acacia polyadenia
- Acacia polybotrya
- Acacia polystachya
- Acacia porcata
- Acacia praelongata
- Acacia praemorsa
- Acacia praetermissa
- Acacia prainii
- Acacia pravifolia
- Acacia pravissima – Ovens wattle
- Acacia preissiana
- Acacia prismifolia
- Acacia pritzeliana
- Acacia producta
- Acacia profusa
- Acacia proiantha
- Acacia prolata
- Acacia prominens
- Acacia provincialis
- Acacia proxima
- Acacia pruinocarpa
- Acacia pruinosa
- Acacia pteraneura
- Acacia pterocaulon
- Acacia ptychoclada
- Acacia ptychophylla
- Acacia pubescens
- Acacia pubicosta
- Acacia pubifolia
- Acacia pubirhachis
- Acacia pudica
- Acacia pulchella
- Acacia pulviniformis
- Acacia puncticulata
- Acacia purpureapetala
- Acacia pusilla
- Acacia pustula
- Acacia pycnantha - golden wattle
- Acacia pycnocephala
- Acacia pycnostachya
- Acacia pygmaea
- Acacia pyrifolia

== Q ==
- Acacia quadrilateralis
- Acacia quadrimarginea
- Acacia quadrisulcata
- Acacia quinquenervia
- Acacia quornensis

== R ==
- Acacia racospermoides
- Acacia ramiflora
- Acacia ramulosa
- Acacia recurvata
- Acacia redolens
- Acacia rendlei
- Acacia repanda
- Acacia repens
- Acacia resinimarginea
- Acacia resinistipulea
- Acacia resinocostata
- Acacia resinosa
- Acacia restiacea
- Acacia retinervis
- Acacia retinodes – wirilda
- Acacia retivenea
  - Acacia retivenea subsp. clandestina
  - Acacia retivenea subsp. retivenea
- Acacia retrorsa
- Acacia rhamphophylla
- Acacia rhetinocarpa
- Acacia rhigiophylla
- Acacia rhodophloia
- Acacia rhodoxylon
- Acacia riceana – Rice's wattle
- Acacia richardsii
- Acacia richii (Fiji)
- Acacia ridleyana
- Acacia rigens
- Acacia rigescens
- Acacia rivalis
- Acacia robeorum
- Acacia robiniae
- Acacia rossei
- Acacia rostellata
- Acacia rostellifera
- Acacia rostriformis
- Acacia rothii
- Acacia roycei
- Acacia rubida
- Acacia rubricaulis
- Acacia rubricola
- Acacia rupicola
- Acacia ruppii
- Acacia ryaniana

== S ==
- Acacia sabulosa
- Acacia saliciformis
- Acacia salicina – cooba
- Acacia saligna
- Acacia saxatilis
- Acacia saxicola
- Acacia scabra
- Acacia scalena
- Acacia scalpelliformis
- Acacia schinoides
- Acacia sciophanes
- Acacia scirpifolia
- Acacia scleroclada
- Acacia sclerophylla
- Acacia sclerosperma
  - Acacia sclerosperma subsp. glaucescens
  - Acacia sclerosperma subsp. sclerosperma
- Acacia scopulorum
- Acacia seclusa
- Acacia sedifolia
  - Acacia sedifolia subsp. pulvinata
  - Acacia sedifolia subsp. sedifolia
- Acacia × semiaurea Maiden & Blakely
- Acacia semicircinalis
- Acacia semilunata – crescent-leaved wattle (Qld.)
- Acacia semirigida
- Acacia semitrullata
- Acacia sericata
- Acacia sericocarpa
- Acacia sericoflora
- Acacia sericophylla
- Acacia serpentinicola
- Acacia sertiformis
- Acacia sessilis
- Acacia sessilispica
- Acacia setulifera
- Acacia shapelleae
- Acacia shirleyi
- Acacia shuttleworthii
- Acacia sibilans
- Acacia sibina
- Acacia sibirica
- Acacia siculiformis – dagger wattle, creek wattle (N.S.W., A.C.T., Vic., Tas.)
- Acacia signata
- Acacia silvestris
- Acacia simmonsiana
- Acacia simplex (Pacific Islands)
- Acacia simsii
- Acacia simulans
- Acacia singula
- Acacia smeringa
- Acacia solenota
- Acacia sophorae
- Acacia sorophylla
- Acacia spania
- Acacia sparsiflora
- Acacia spathulifolia
- Acacia speckii
- Acacia spectabilis – Mudgee wattle
- Acacia spectrum
- Acacia sphacelata
  - Acacia sphacelata subsp. recurva
  - Acacia sphacelata subsp. sphacelata
  - Acacia sphacelata subsp. verticillata
- Acacia sphaerostachya
- Acacia sphenophylla
- Acacia spilleriana
- Acacia spinescens
- Acacia spinosissima
- Acacia spirorbis
  - Acacia spirorbis subsp. solandri
  - Acacia spirorbis subsp. spirorbis
- Acacia splendens
- Acacia spondylophylla
- Acacia spongolitica
- Acacia spooneri
- Acacia sporadica
- Acacia squamata
- Acacia stanleyi
- Acacia startii
- Acacia steedmanii
  - Acacia steedmanii subsp. borealis
  - Acacia steedmanii subsp. steedmanii
- Acacia stellaticeps
- Acacia stenophylla
- Acacia stenoptera
- Acacia stereophylla
- Acacia stictophylla
- Acacia stigmatophylla
- Acacia stipuligera
- Acacia stipulosa
- Acacia storyi
- Acacia striatifolia
- Acacia stricta
- Acacia strongylophylla
- Acacia suaveolens – sweet wattle
- Acacia subcaerulea
- Acacia subcontorta
- Acacia subflexuosa
  - Acacia subflexuosa subsp. capillata
  - Acacia subflexuosa subsp. subflexuosa
- Acacia sublanata
- Acacia subporosa
- Acacia subracemosa
- Acacia subrigida
- Acacia subsessilis
- Acacia subternata
- Acacia subtessarogona
- Acacia subtiliformis
- Acacia subtilinervis
- Acacia subulata
- Acacia sulcata
- Acacia sulcaticaulis
- Acacia symonii
- Acacia synantha
- Acacia synchronicia
- Acacia synoria

== T ==
- Acacia tabula
- Acacia tarculensis
- Acacia tayloriana
- Acacia telmica
- Acacia tenuinervis
- Acacia tenuior
- Acacia tenuispica
- Acacia tenuissima
- Acacia tephrina
- Acacia teretifolia
- Acacia terminalis – sunshine wattle
- Acacia tessellata
- Acacia tetanophylla
- Acacia tetragonocarpa
- Acacia tetragonophylla
- Acacia tetraneura
- Acacia tetraptera
- Acacia thieleana
- Acacia thoma
- Acacia thomsonii
- Acacia tindaleae
- Acacia tingoorensis
- Acacia tolmerensis
- Acacia toondulya
- Acacia torringtonensis
- Acacia torticarpa
- Acacia torulosa
- Acacia trachycarpa
- Acacia trachyphloia
- Acacia translucens
- Acacia trapeziodea
- Acacia tratmaniana
- Acacia trigonophylla
- Acacia trinalis
- Acacia trinervata
- Acacia trineura
- Acacia triptera
- Acacia triptycha
- Acacia triquetra
- Acacia tropica
- Acacia truculenta
- Acacia trudgeniana
- Acacia trulliformis
- Acacia truncata
- Acacia tuberculata
- Acacia tumida
- Acacia tysonii

== U ==
- Acacia ulicifolia
- Acacia ulicina
- Acacia uliginosa
- Acacia umbellata
- Acacia umbraculiformis
- Acacia uncifera
- Acacia uncifolia
- Acacia uncinata
- Acacia uncinella
- Acacia undoolyana
- Acacia undosa
- Acacia undulifolia
- Acacia unguicula
- Acacia unifissilis
- Acacia ureniae
- Acacia urophylla

== V ==
- Acacia validinervia
- Acacia varia
- Acacia vassalii
- Acacia venulosa
- Acacia verniciflua
- Acacia veronica
- Acacia verricula
- Acacia verticillata – prickly Moses
  - Acacia verticillata subsp. cephalantha
  - Acacia verticillata subsp. ovoidea
  - Acacia verticillata subsp. ruscifolia
  - Acacia verticillata subsp. verticillata
- Acacia vestita – hairy wattle
- Acacia victoriae
  - Acacia victoriae subsp. fasciaria
  - Acacia victoriae subsp. victoriae
- Acacia vincentii
- Acacia viscidula
- Acacia viscifolia
- Acacia vittata
- Acacia volubilis

== W ==
- Acacia walkeri
- Acacia wanyu
- Acacia wardellii
- Acacia warramaba
- Acacia wattsiana
- Acacia webbii
- Acacia websteri
- Acacia wetarensis (Lesser Sunda Islands)
- Acacia whibleyana
- Acacia whitei
- Acacia wickhamii
  - Acacia wickhamii subsp. cassitera
  - Acacia wickhamii subsp. wickhamii
- Acacia wilcoxii
- Acacia wilhelmiana
- Acacia willdenowiana
- Acacia williamsiana
- Acacia williamsonii
- Acacia willingii
- Acacia wilsonii
- Acacia wiseana
- Acacia wollarensis
- Acacia woodmaniorum

== X ==
- Acacia xanthina
- Acacia xanthocarpa
- Acacia xerophila
- Acacia xiphophylla

== Y ==
- Acacia yalwalensis
- Acacia yirrkallensis
- Acacia yorkrakinensis
  - Acacia yorkrakinensis subsp. acrita
  - Acacia yorkrakinensis subsp. yorkrakinensis

== Z ==
- Acacia zatrichota

=== Gallery ===
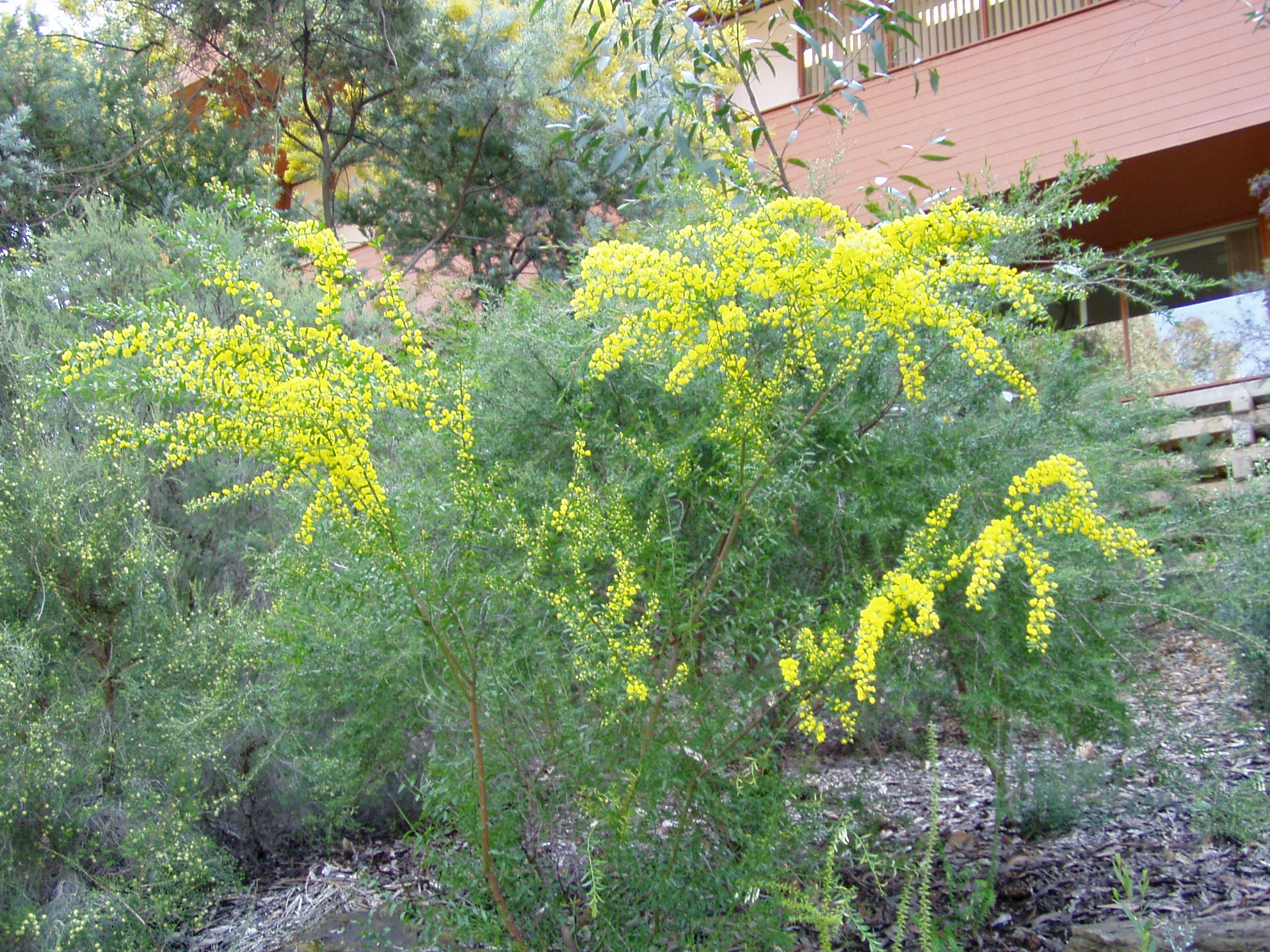
Acacia acinacea

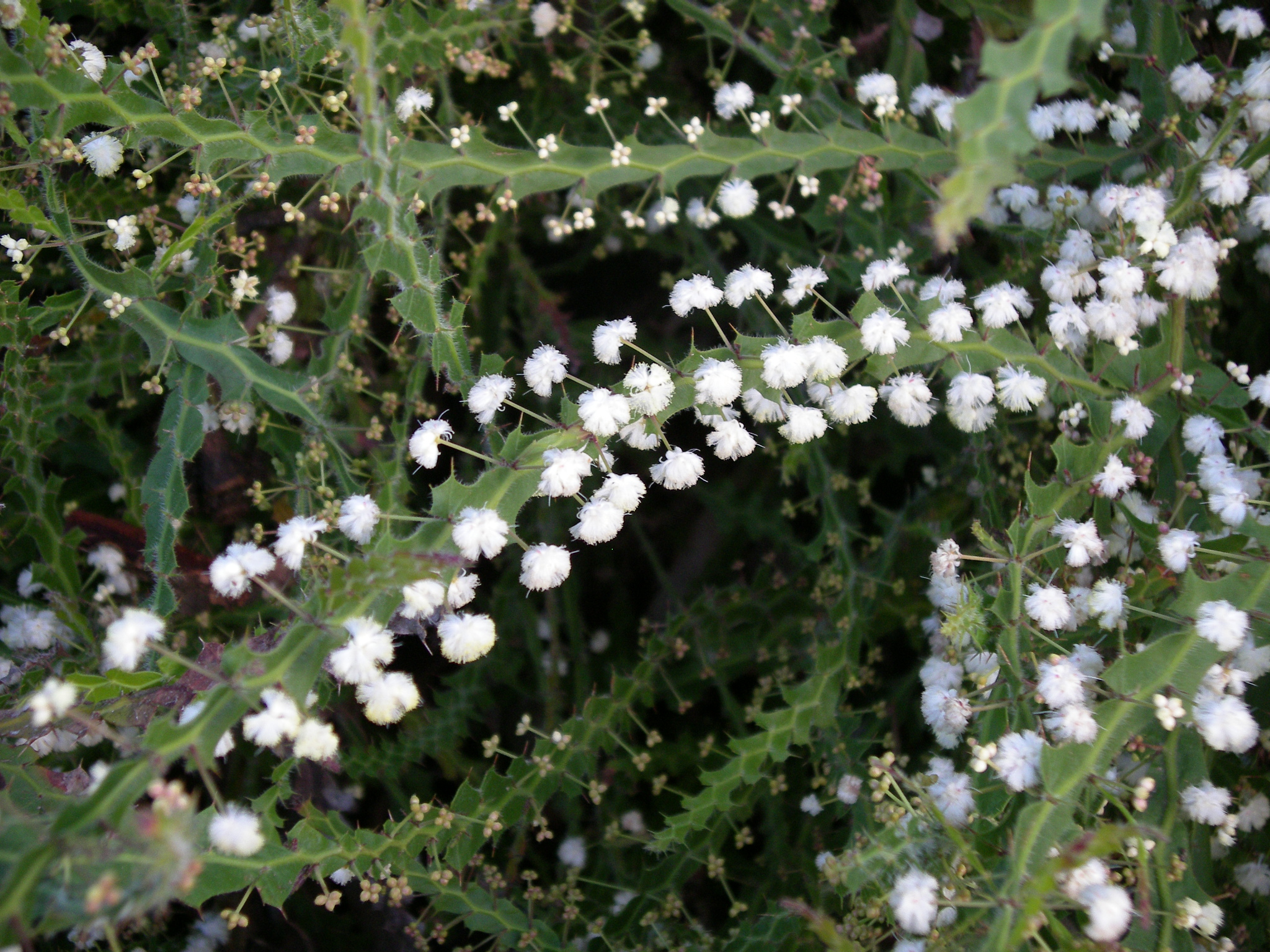
Acacia alata

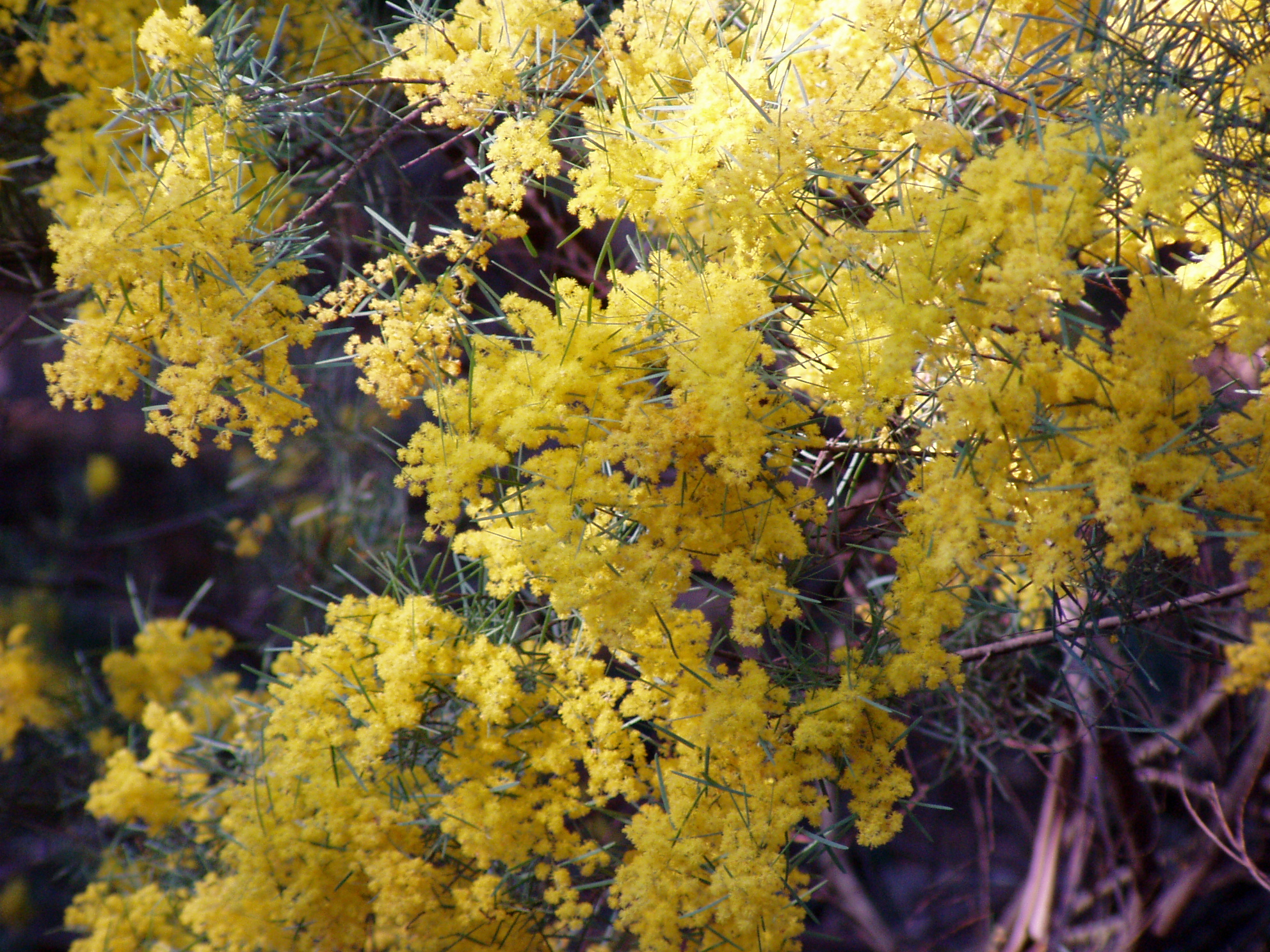
Acacia boormanii

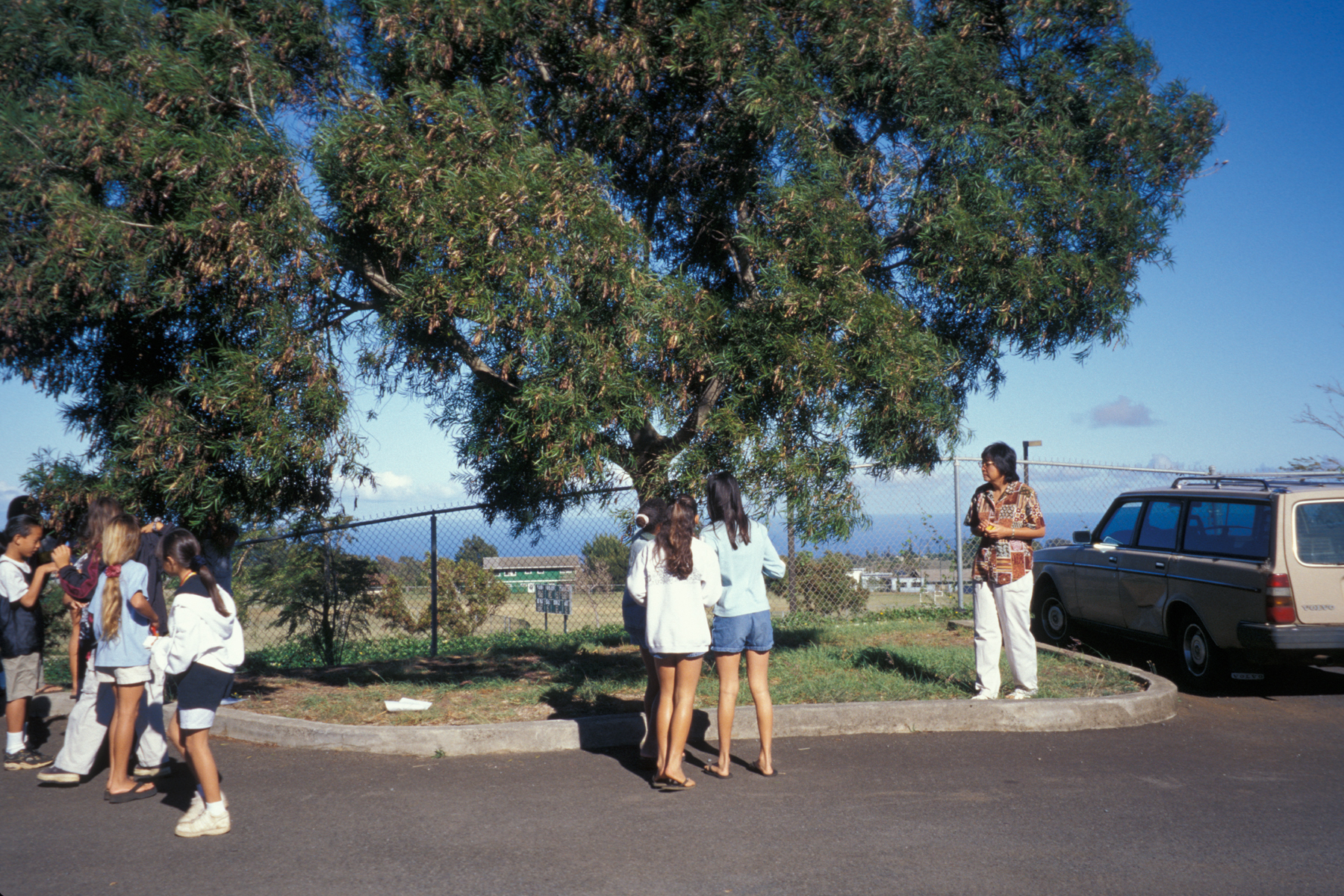
Acacia confusa

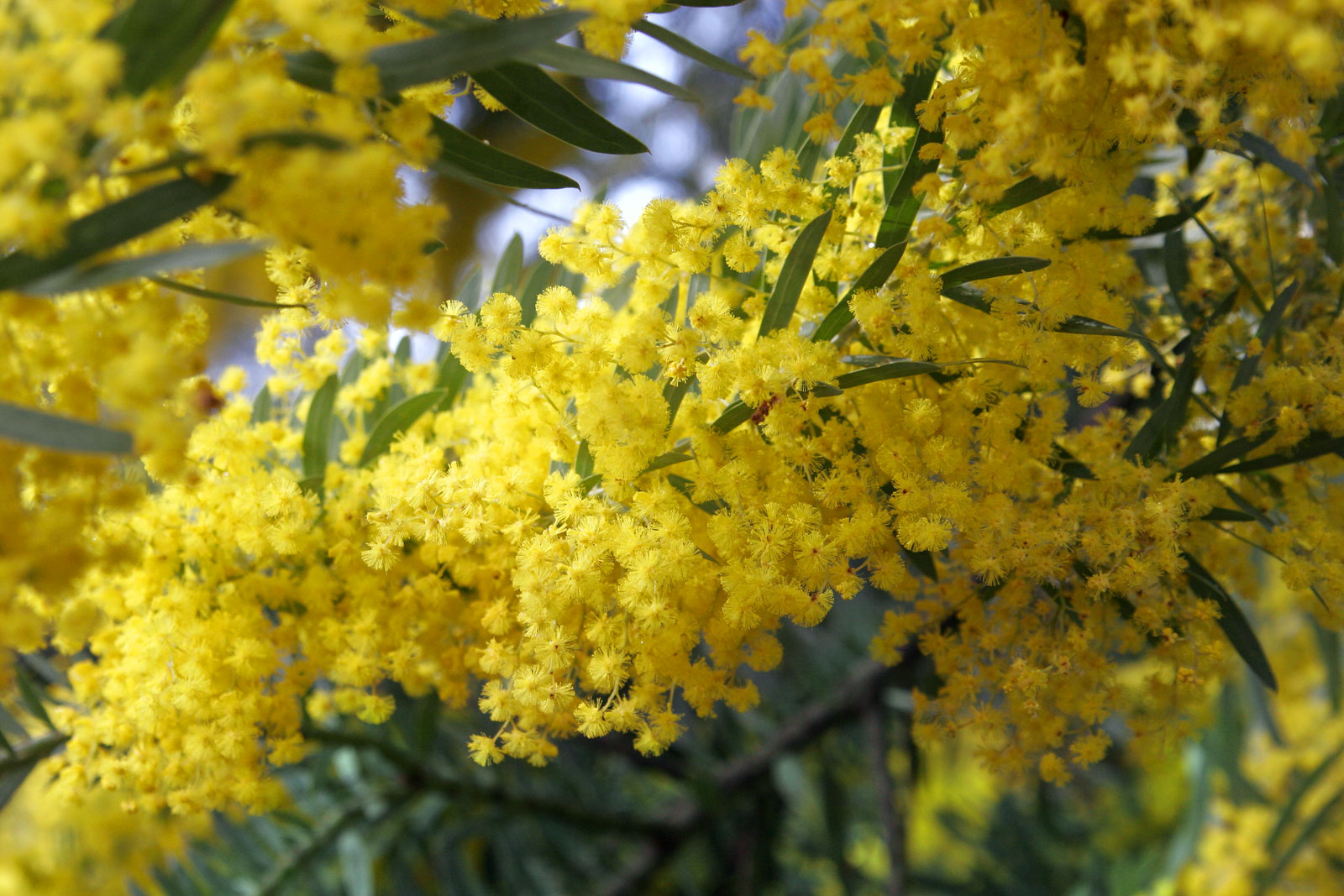
Acacia covenyi

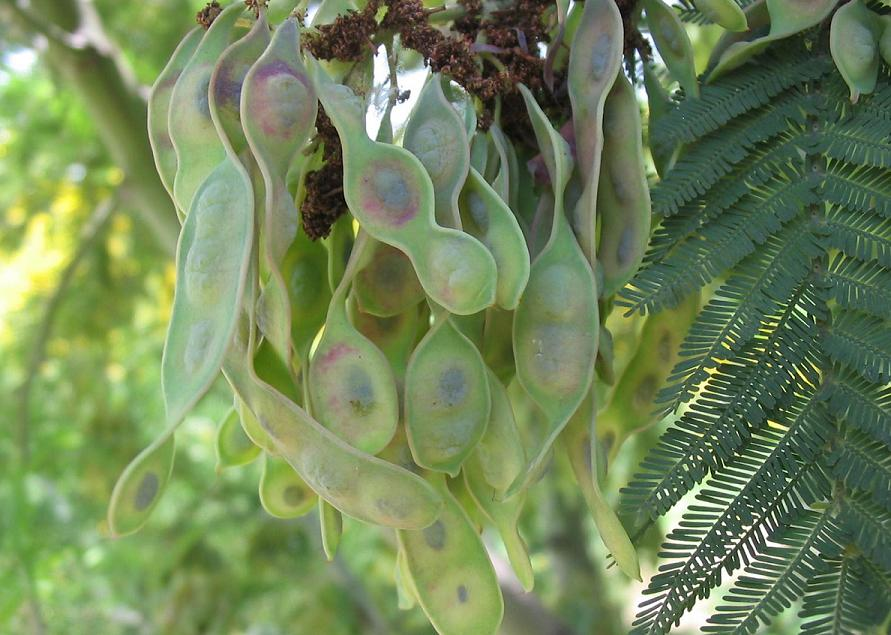
Acacia dealbata - fruit

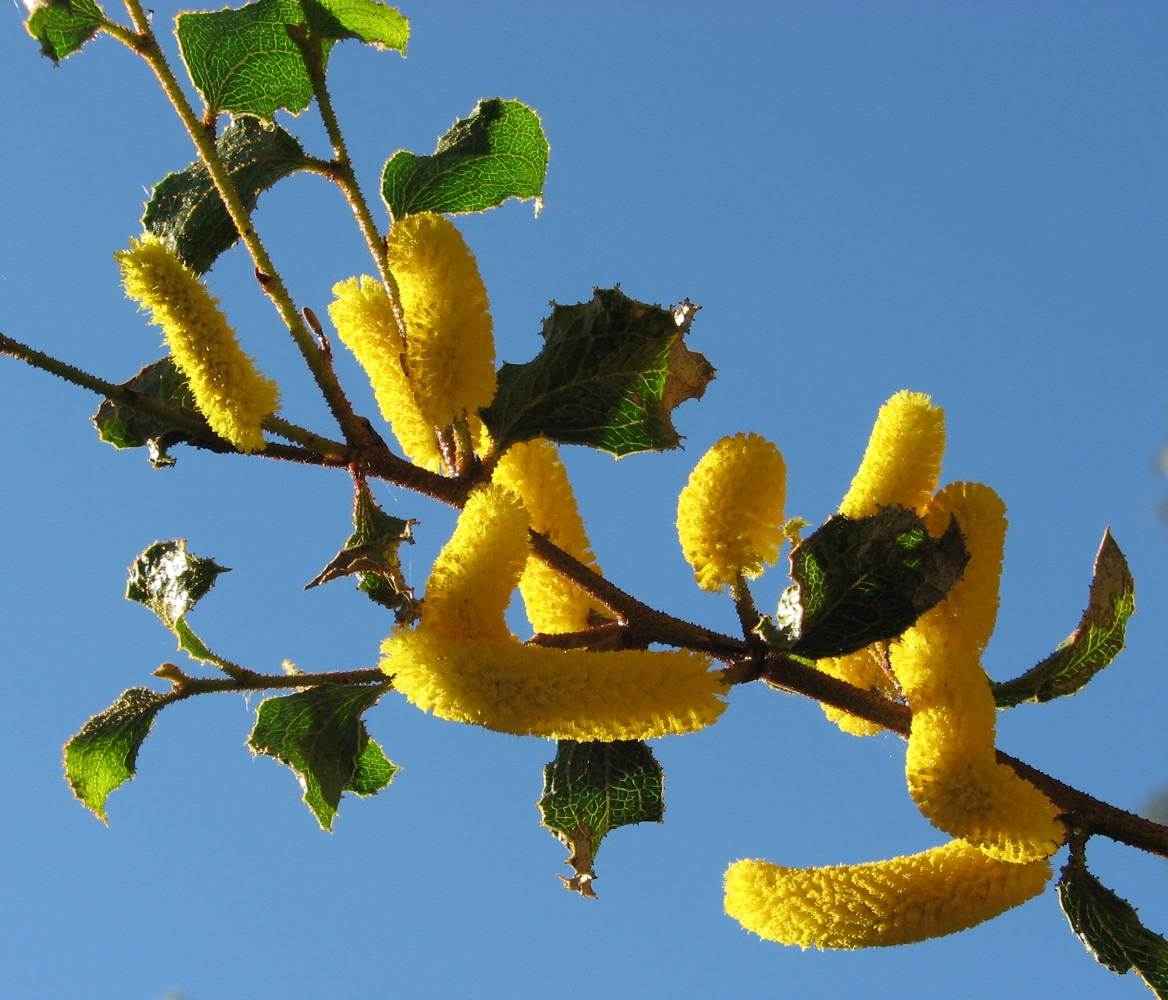
Acacia denticulosa

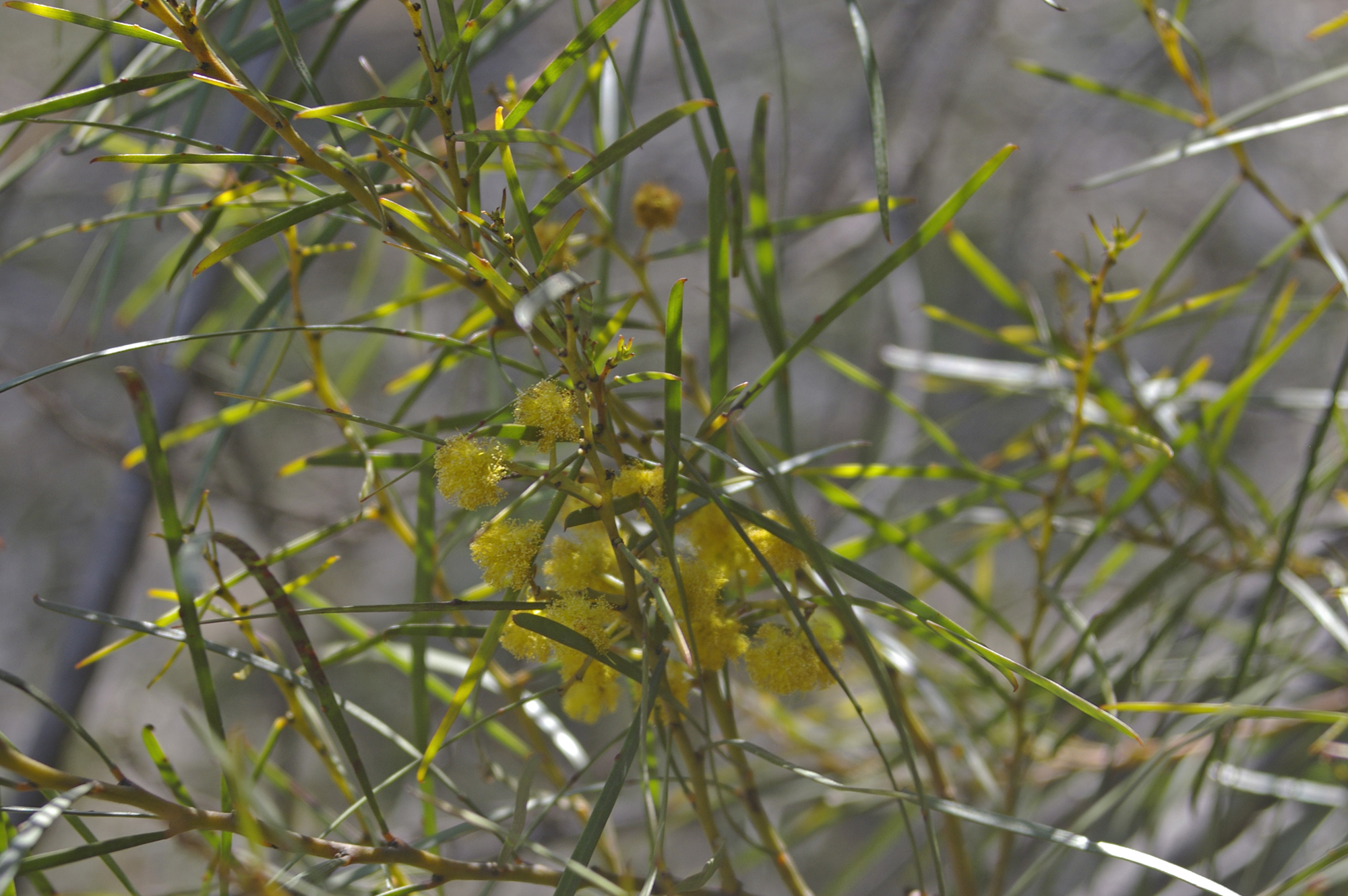
Acacia elongata

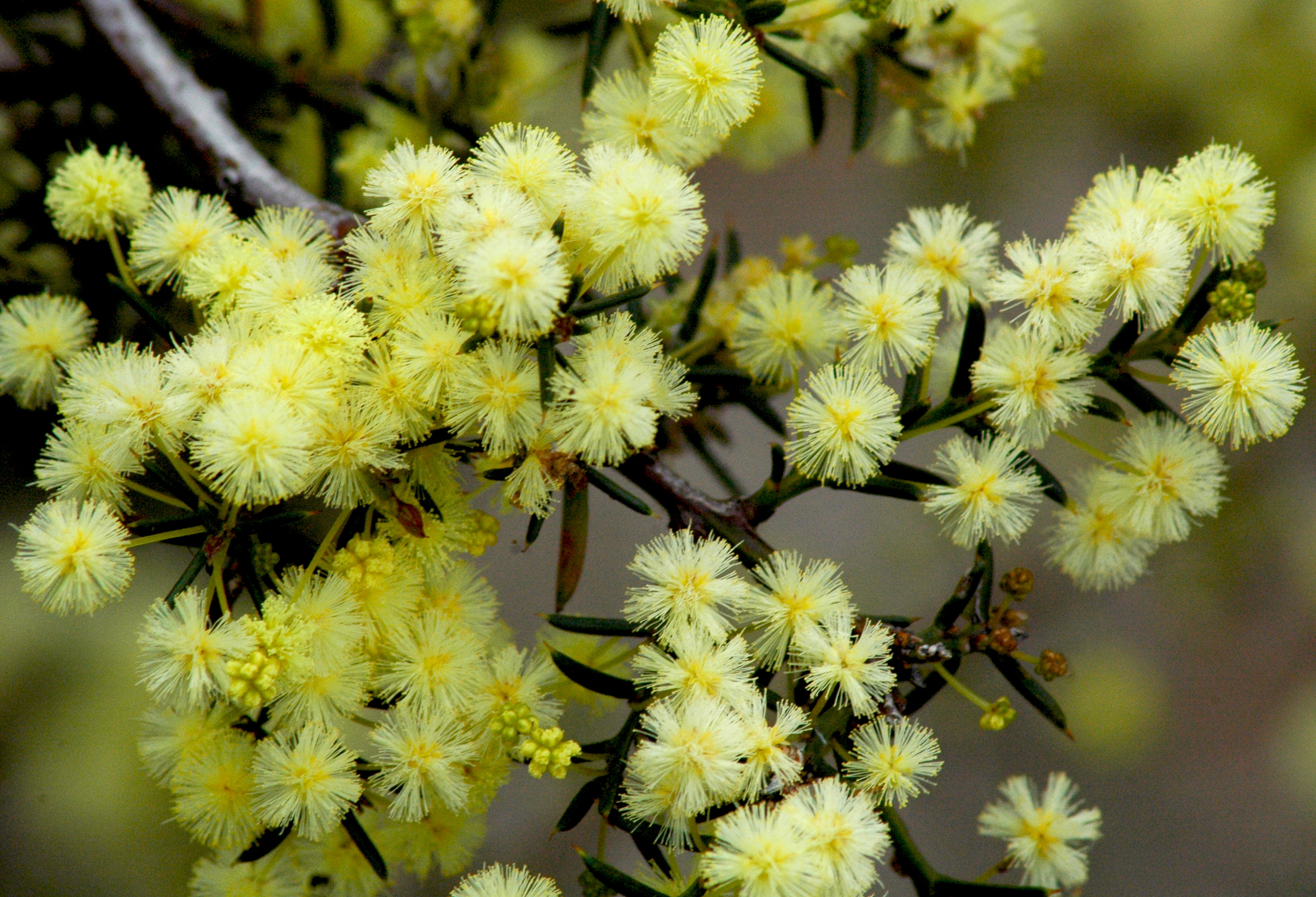
Acacia genistifolia

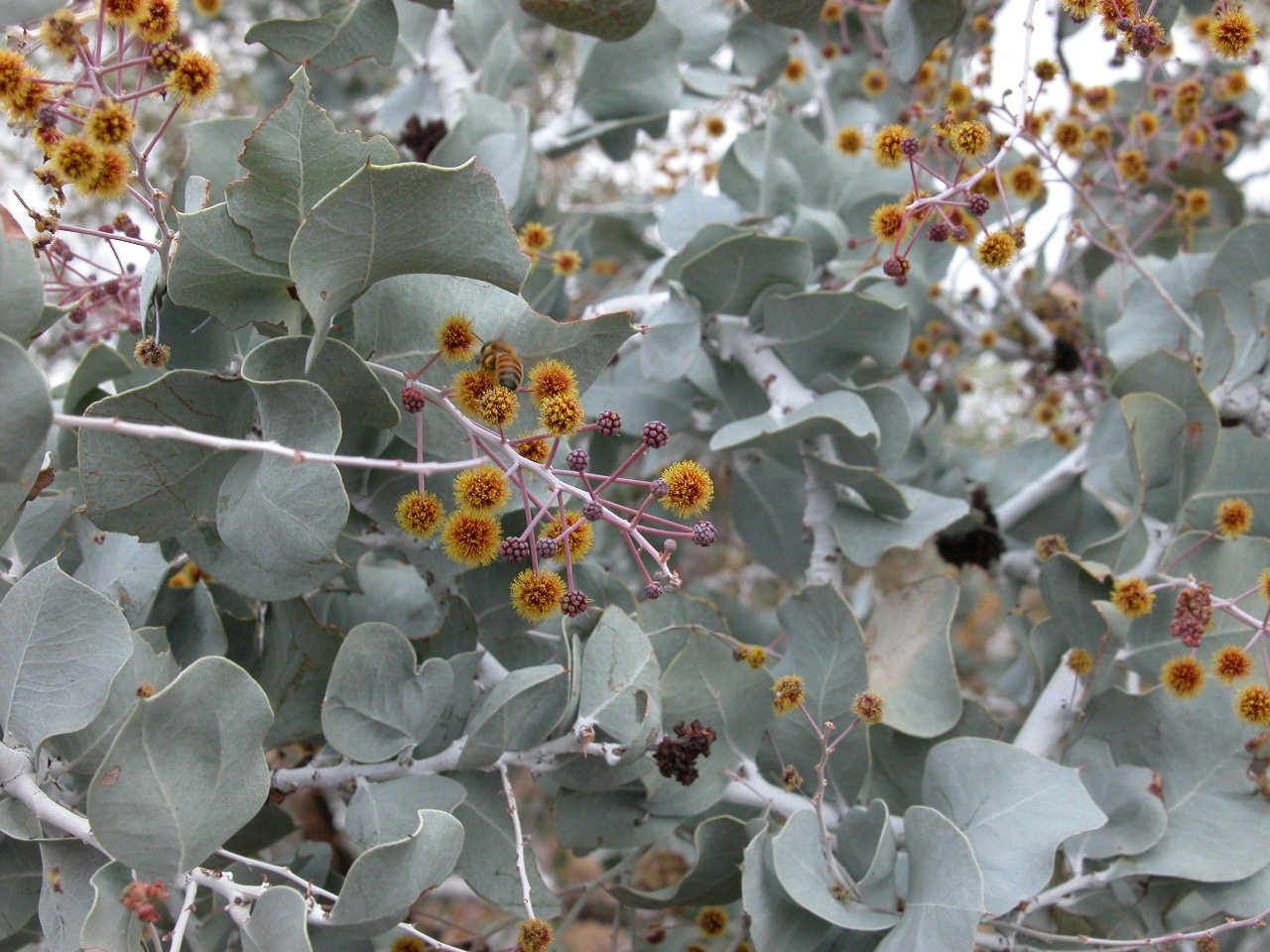
Acacia inaequilatera

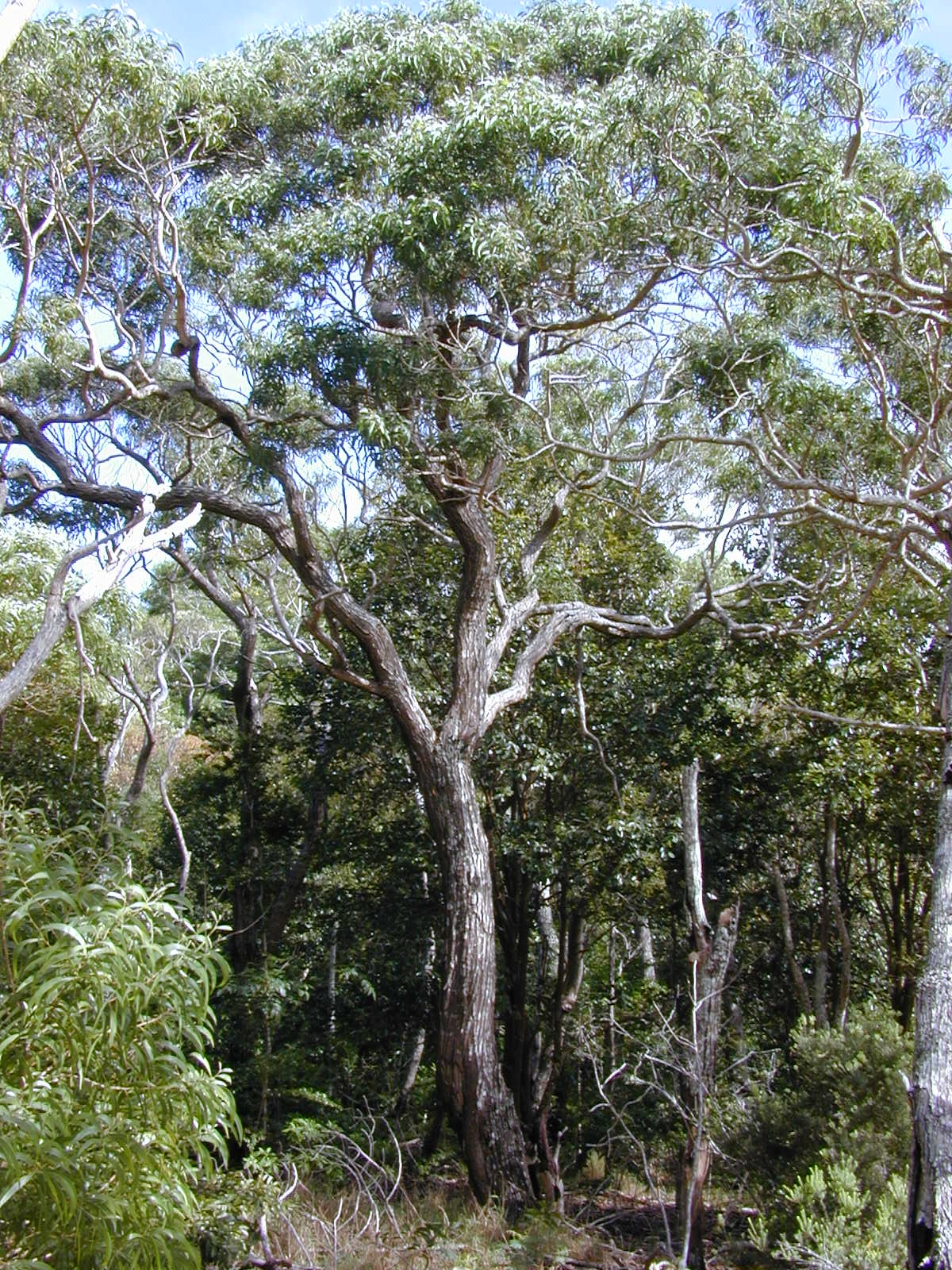
Acacia koa

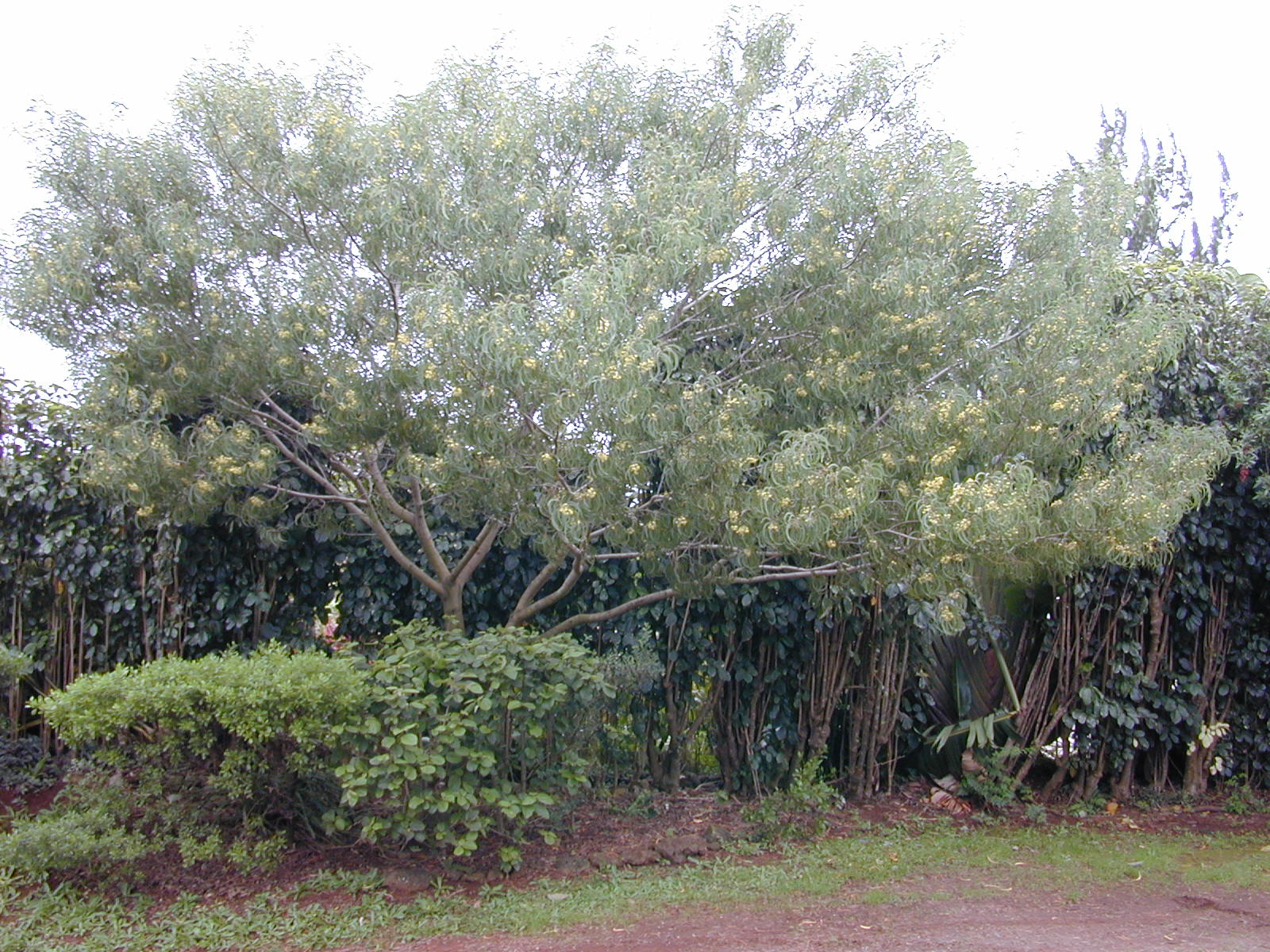
Acacia koaia

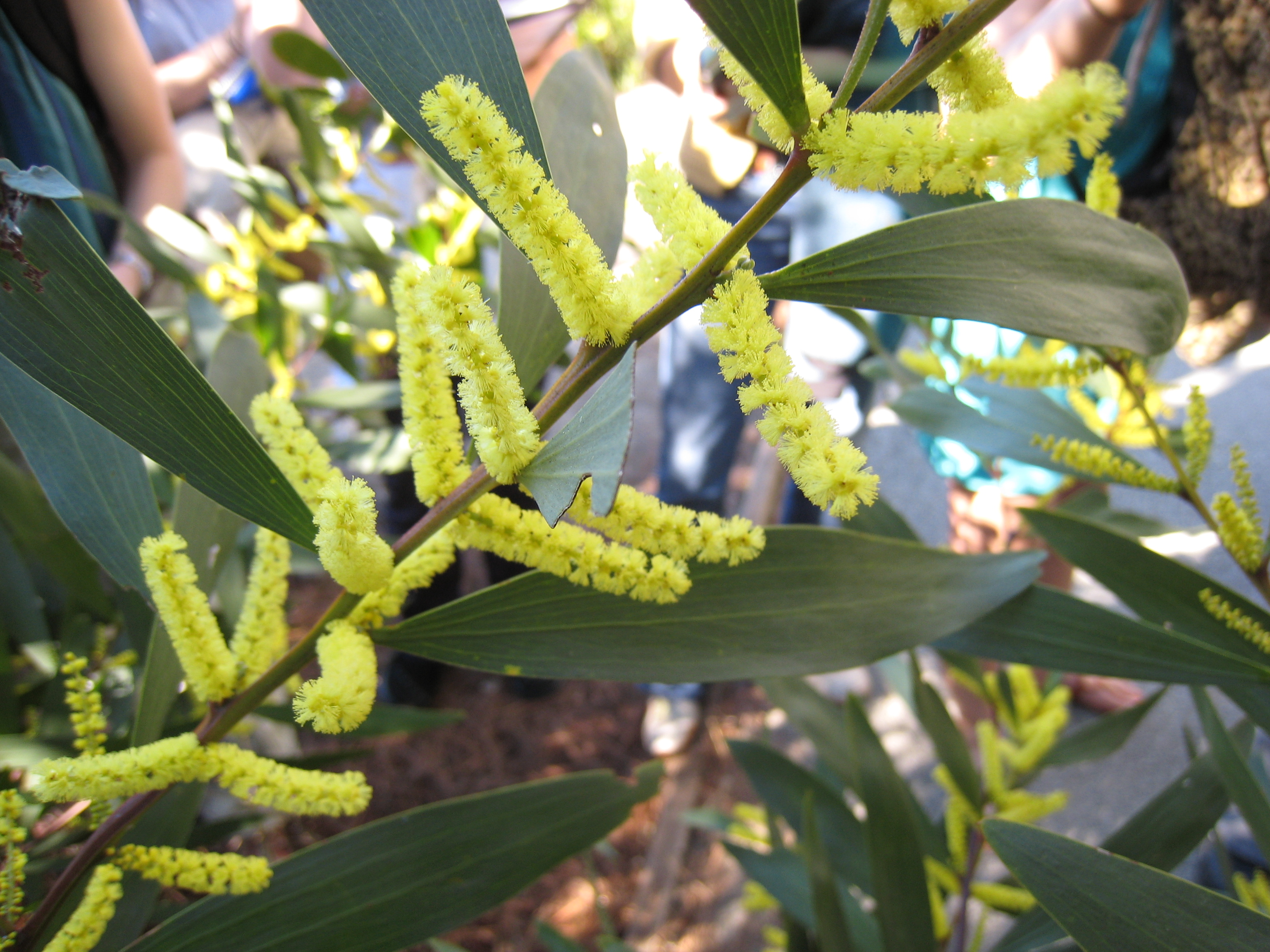
Acacia longifolia

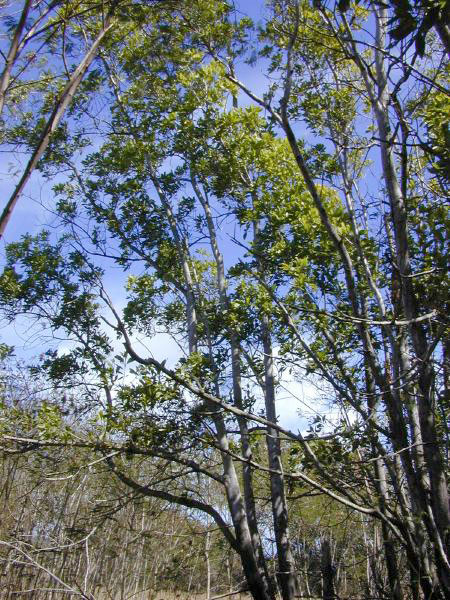
Acacia mangium

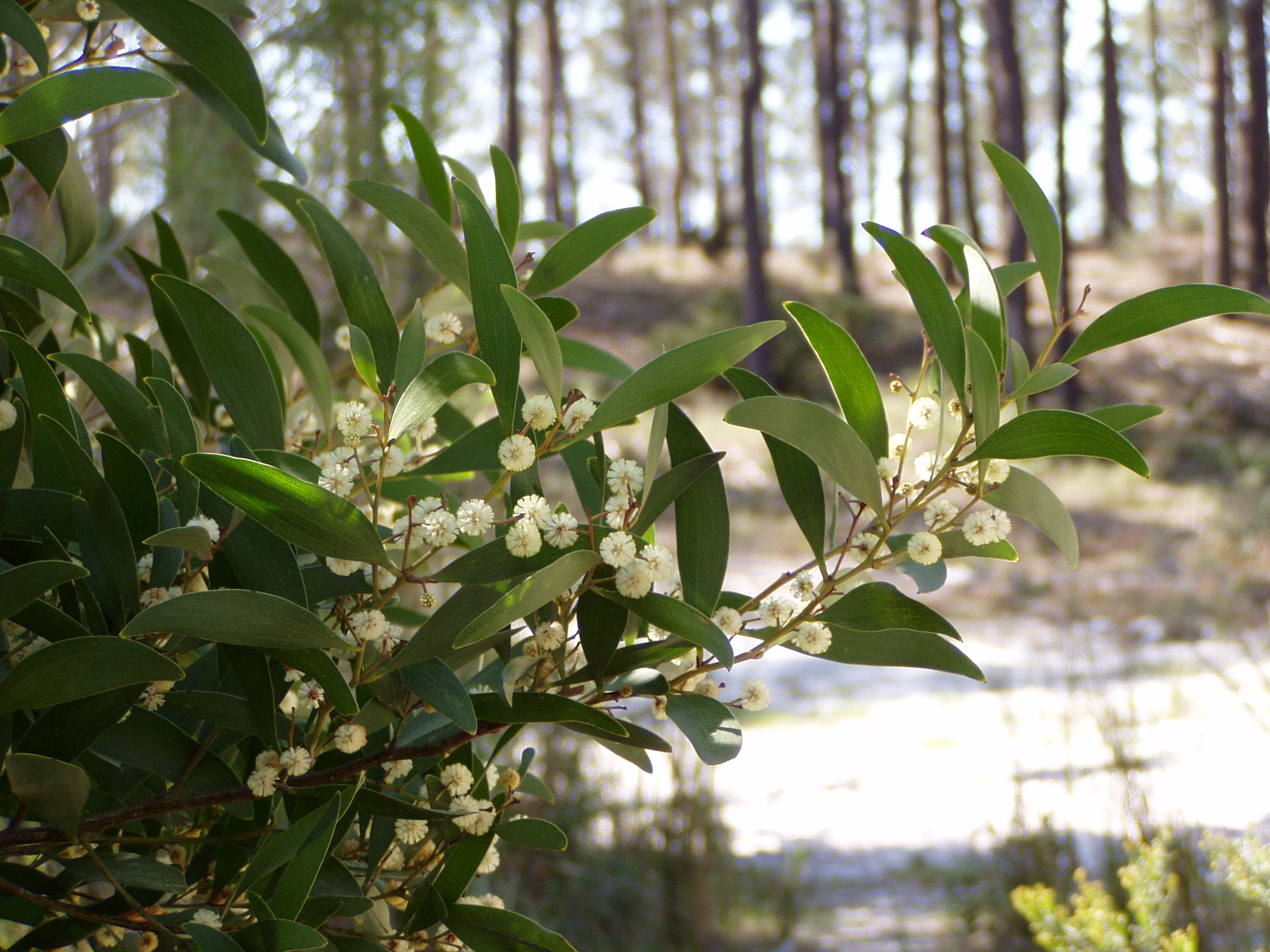
Acacia melanoxylon

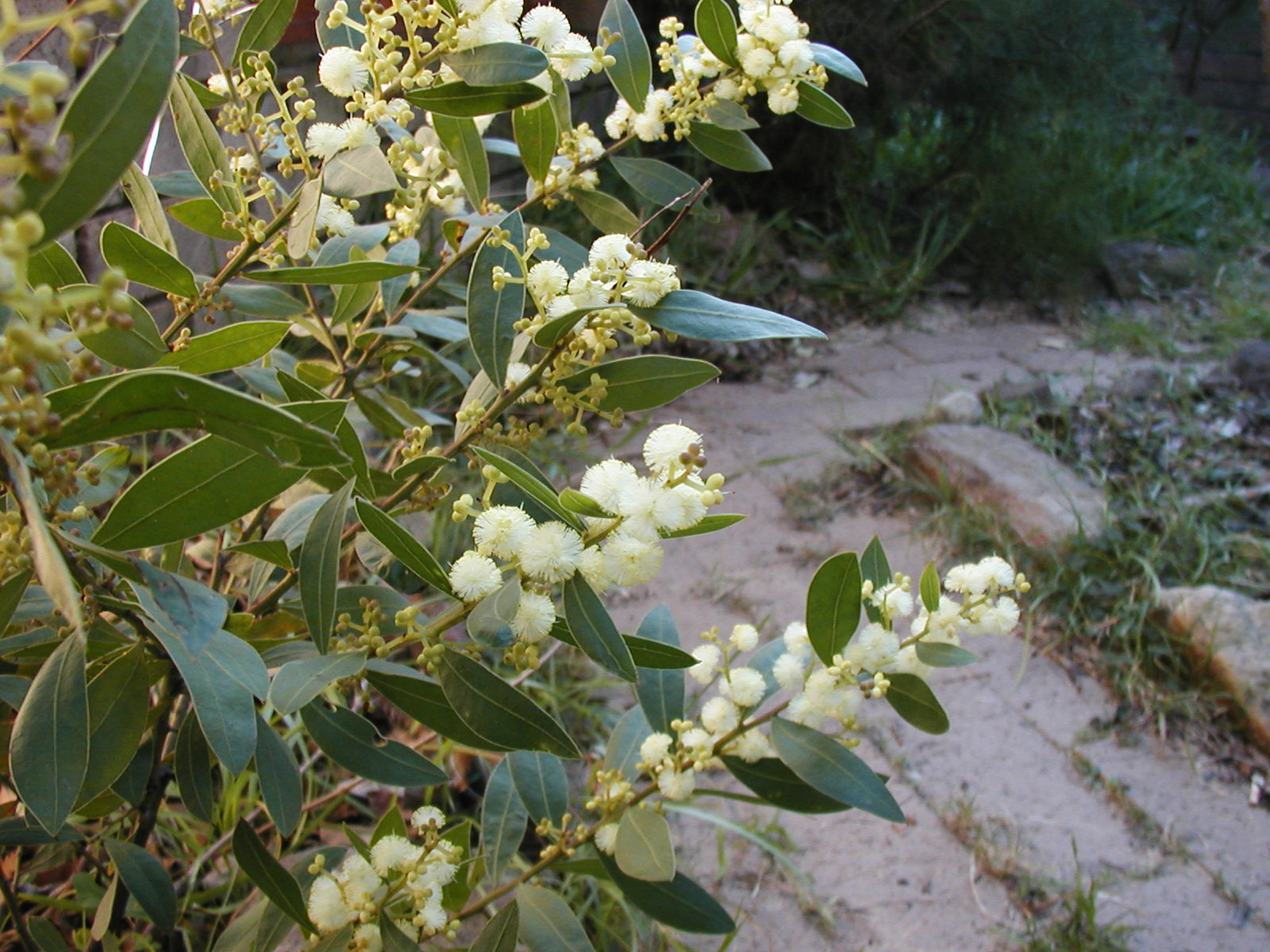
Acacia myrtifolia

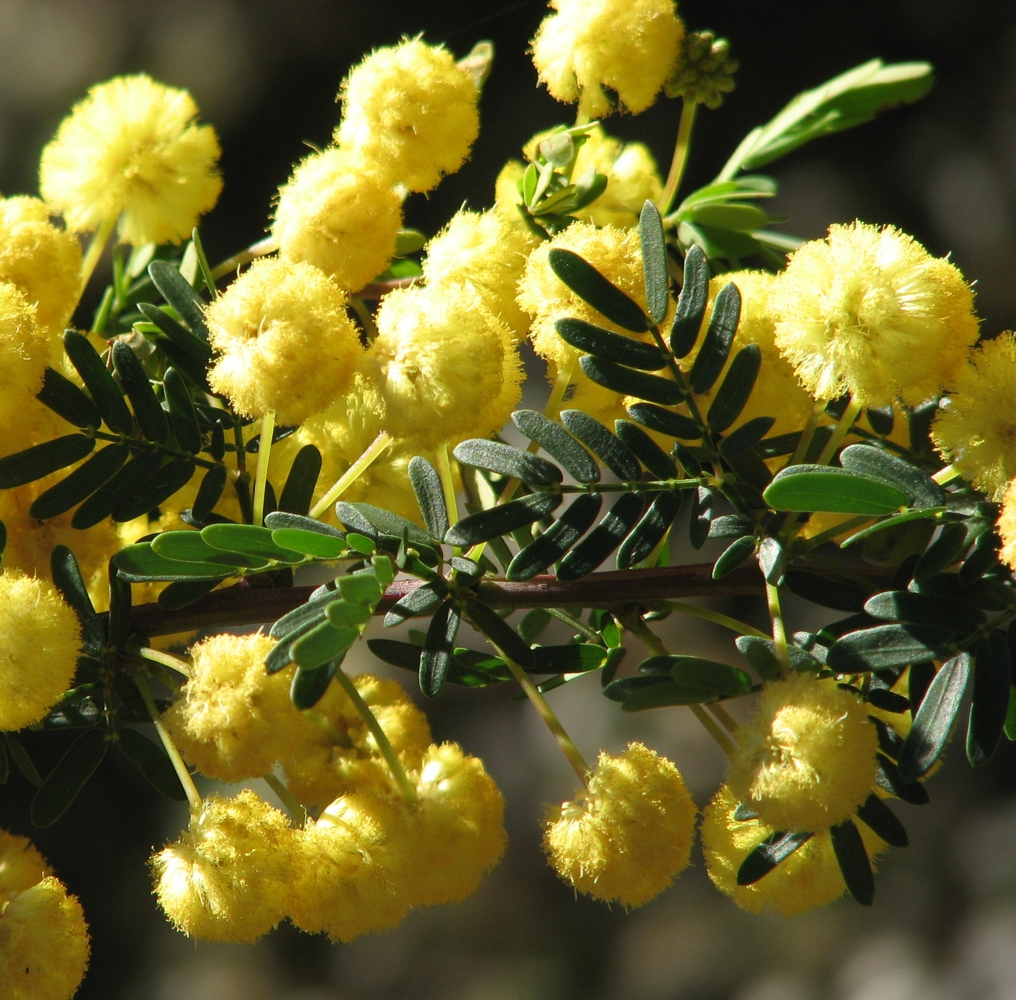
Acacia nigricans

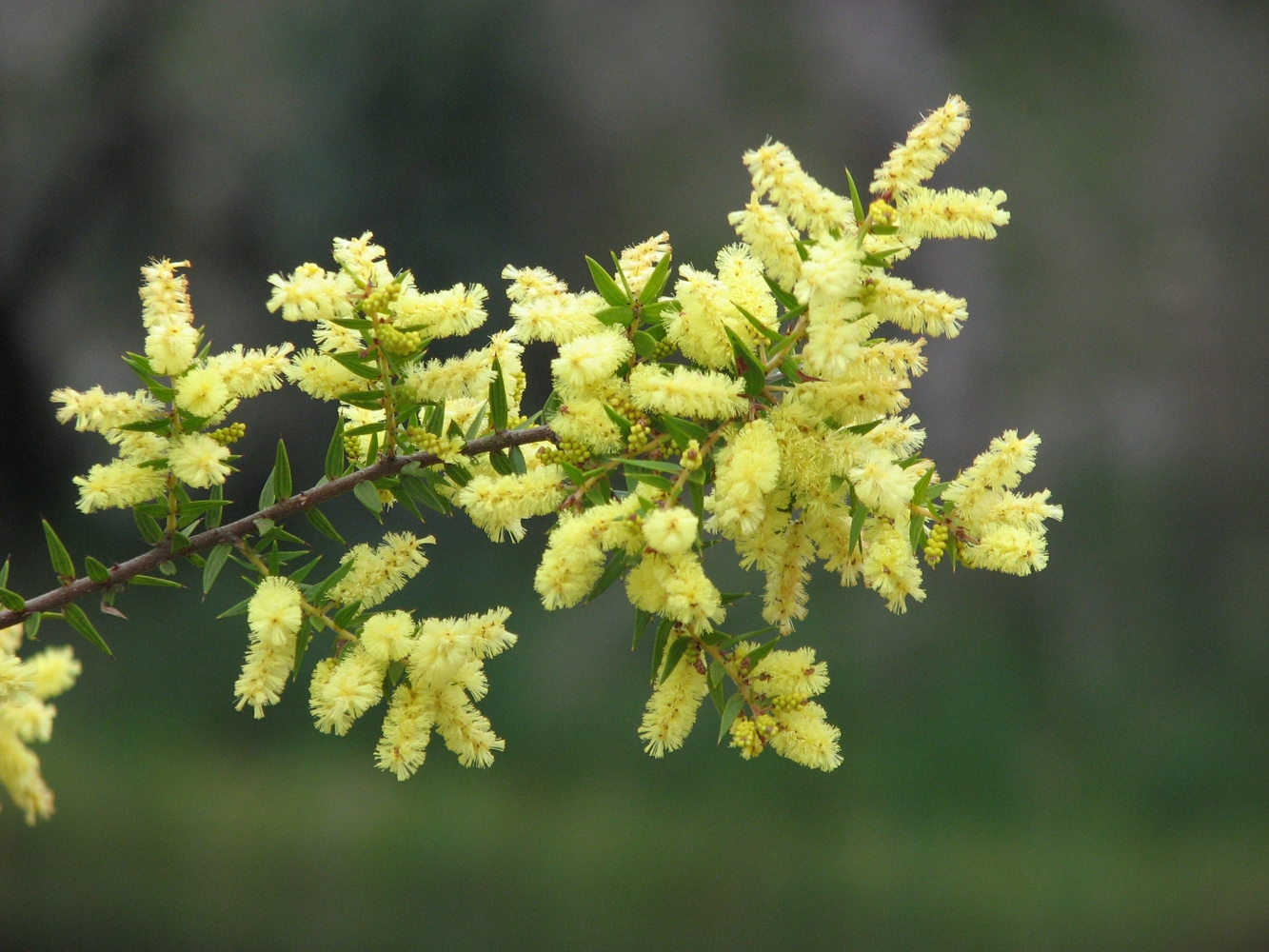
Acacia oxycedrus

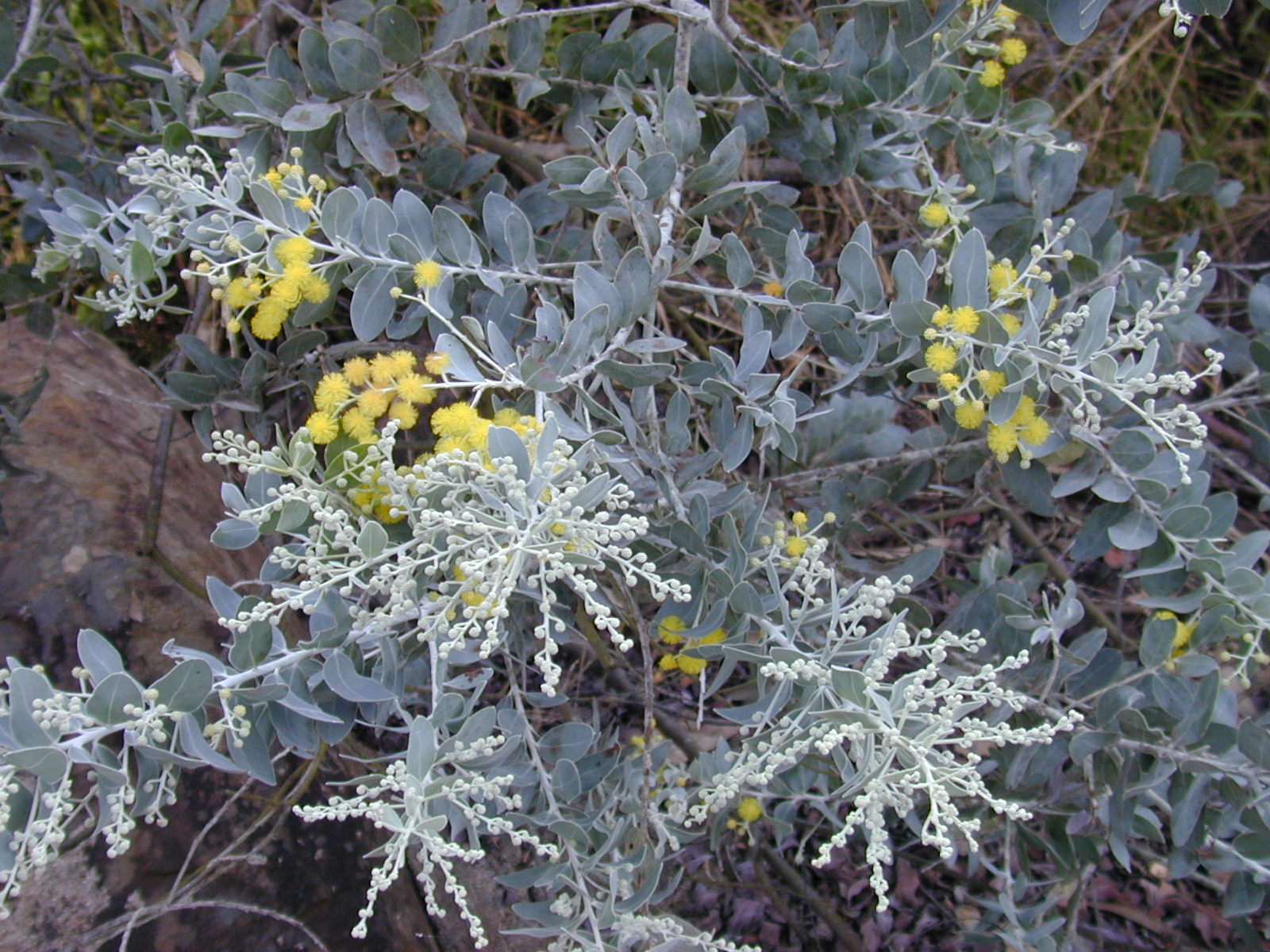
Acacia podalyriifolia

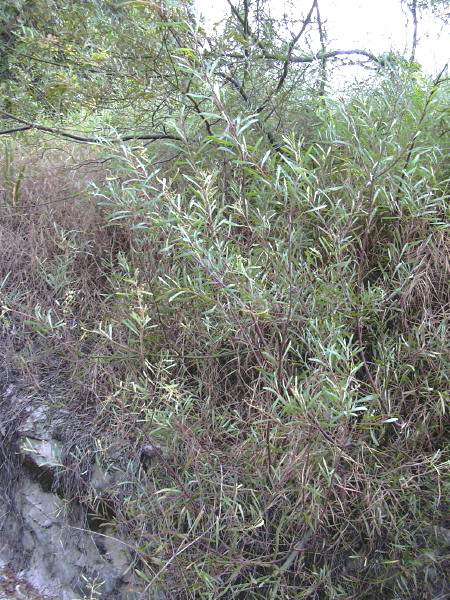
Acacia retinodes

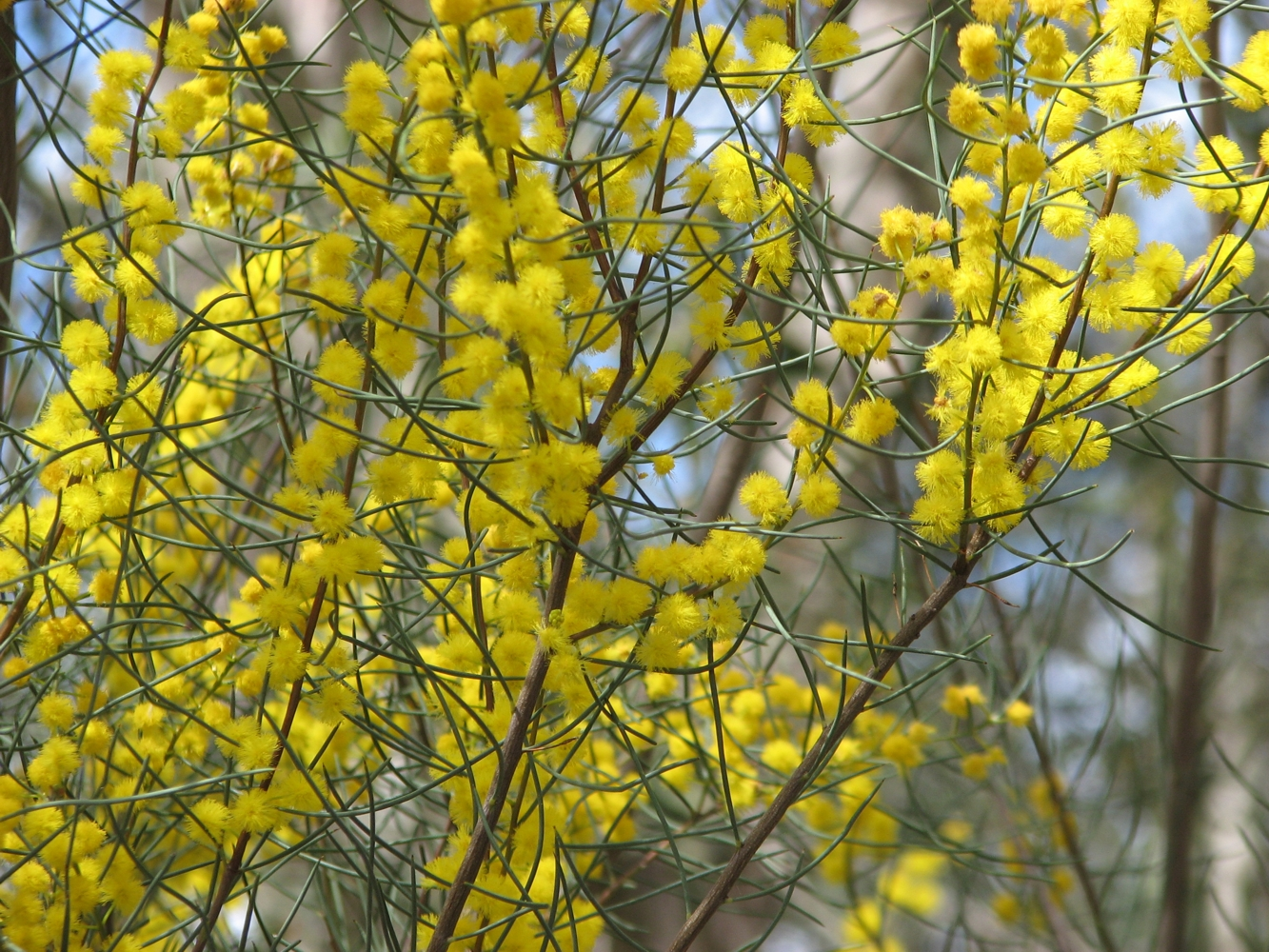
Acacia rigens

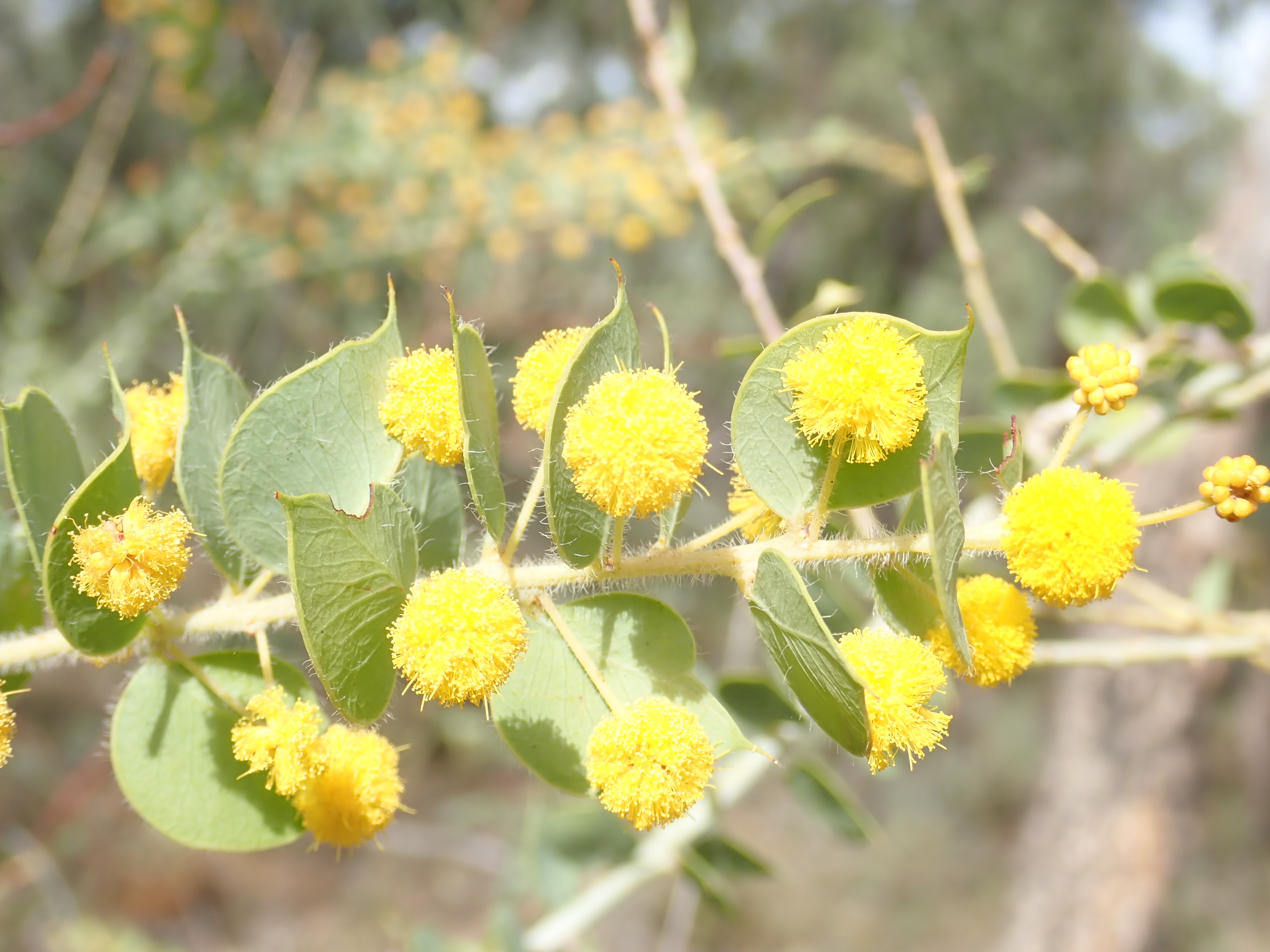
Acacia sertiformis

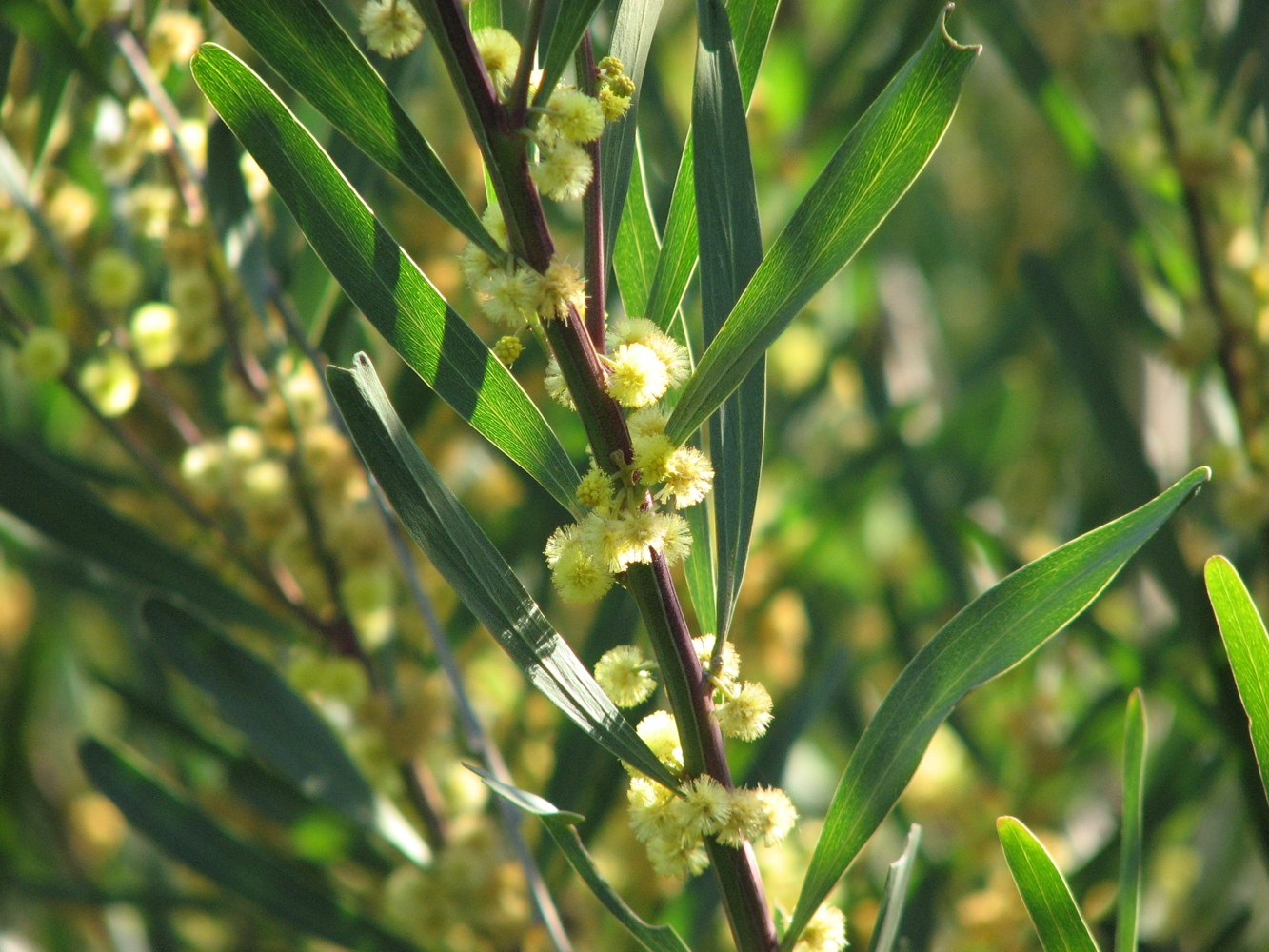
Acacia stricta

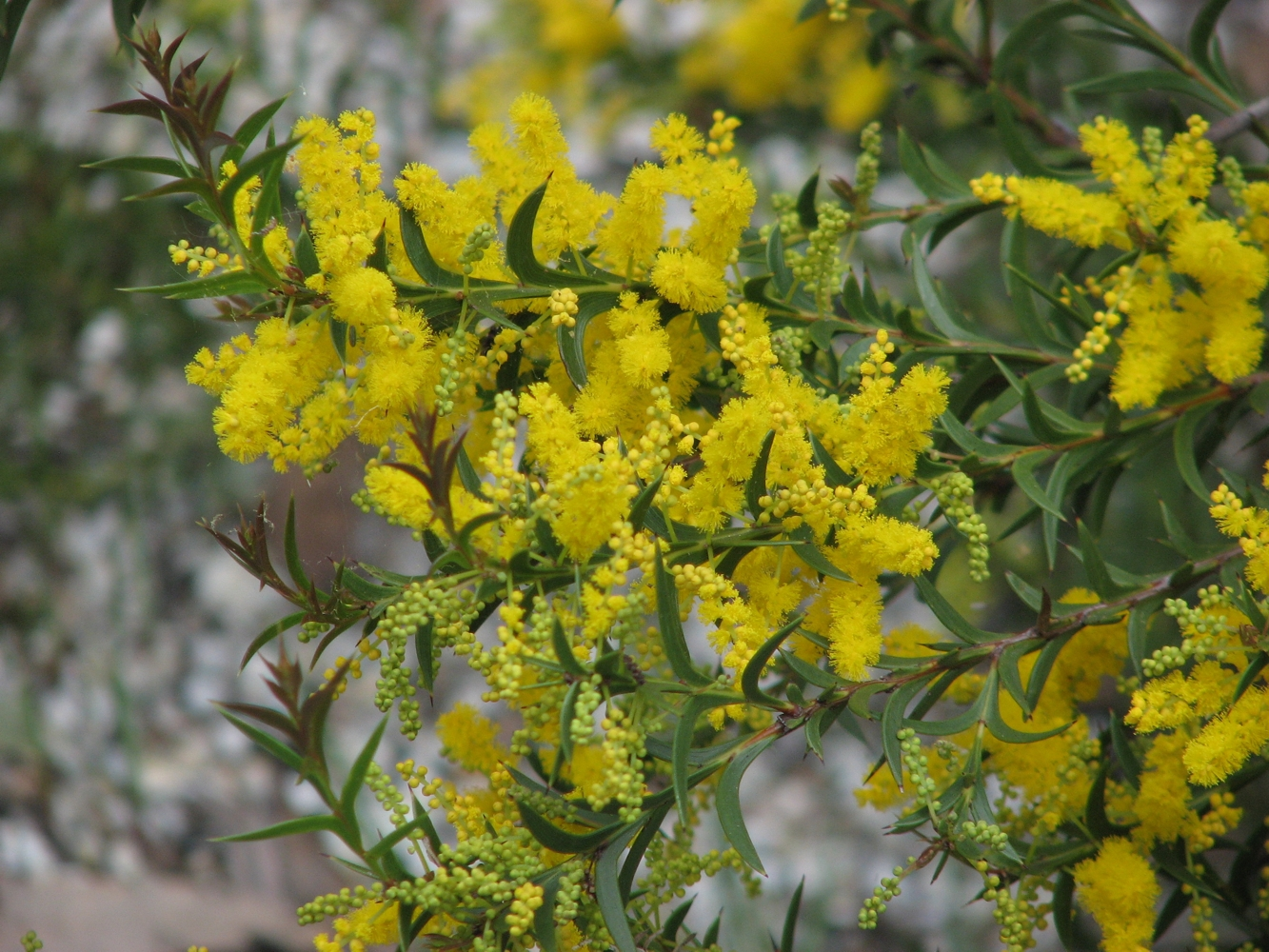
Acacia triptera

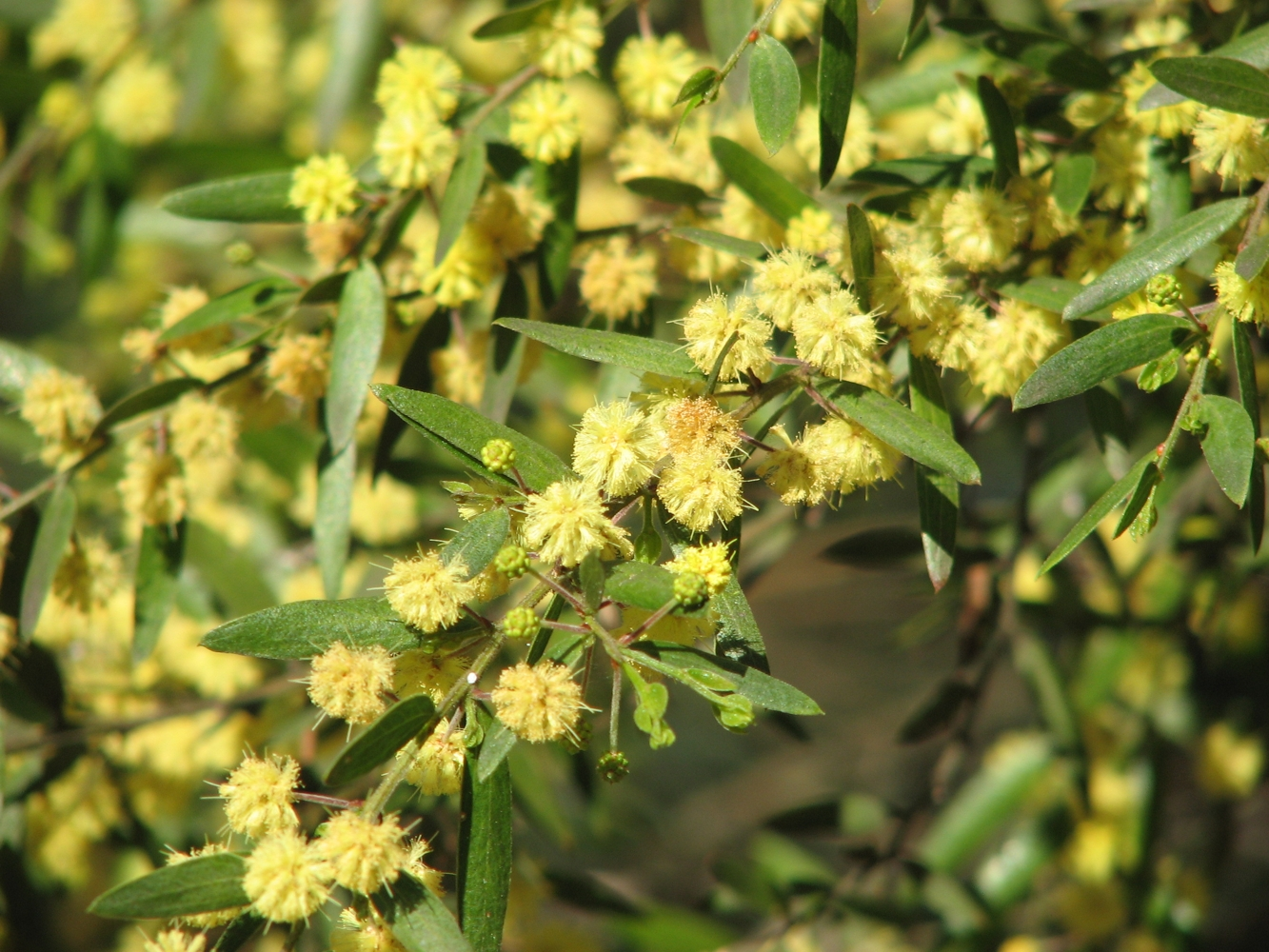
Acacia verniciflua

== Hybrids ==
- Acacia adoxa var. adoxa × spondylophylla
- Acacia adsurgens × rhodophloia
- Acacia ampliceps × bivenosa
- Acacia ampliceps × sclerosperma subsp. sclerosperma
- Acacia ancistrocarpa × arida
- Acacia ancistrocarpa × citrinoviridis
- Acacia ancistrocarpa × hilliana
- Acacia ancistrocarpa × orthocarpa
- Acacia aphanoclada × pyrifolia var. pyrifolia
- Acacia arida × stellaticeps
- Acacia auriculiformis × mangium (either direction)
- Acacia ayersiana × incurvaneura
- Acacia baileyana × dealbata
- Acacia bivenosa × sclerosperma subsp. sclerosperma
- Acacia caesaneura × incurvaneura
- Acacia citrinoviridis × tumida var. pilbarensis
- Acacia craspedocarpa × macraneura
- Acacia craspedocarpa × ramulosa
- Acacia ×daweana Maslin (=? A. effusa × hamersleyensis)
- Acacia decurrens × mearnsii
- Acacia dodonaeifolia × paradoxa
- Acacia eriopoda × monticola
- Acacia eriopoda × trachycarpa
- Acacia eriopoda × tumida var. pilbarensis
- Acacia eriopoda × tumida var. tumida
- Acacia glaucocaesia × synchronicia
- Acacia ×grayana J.H.Willis (= A. brachybotrya × euthycarpa)
- Acacia hilliana × stellaticeps
- Acacia incurvaneura × mulganeura
- Acacia ligulata × sclerosperma subsp. sclerosperma
- Acacia longifolia × oxycedrus
- Acacia monticola × trachycarpa
- Acacia monticola × tumida var. kulparn
- Acacia monticola × tumida var. pilbarensis
- Acacia mucronata × acutata
- Acacia ×nabbonandii Nash (= Acacia baileyana × decurrens)
- Acacia oxycedrus × sophorae
- Acacia rhodophloia × sibirica
- Acacia ×sphaerostachya E.Pritzel (=? Acacia stellaticeps × ancistocarpa)
- Acacia stellaticeps × trachycarpa
- Acacia trachycarpa × tumida var. pilbarensis
