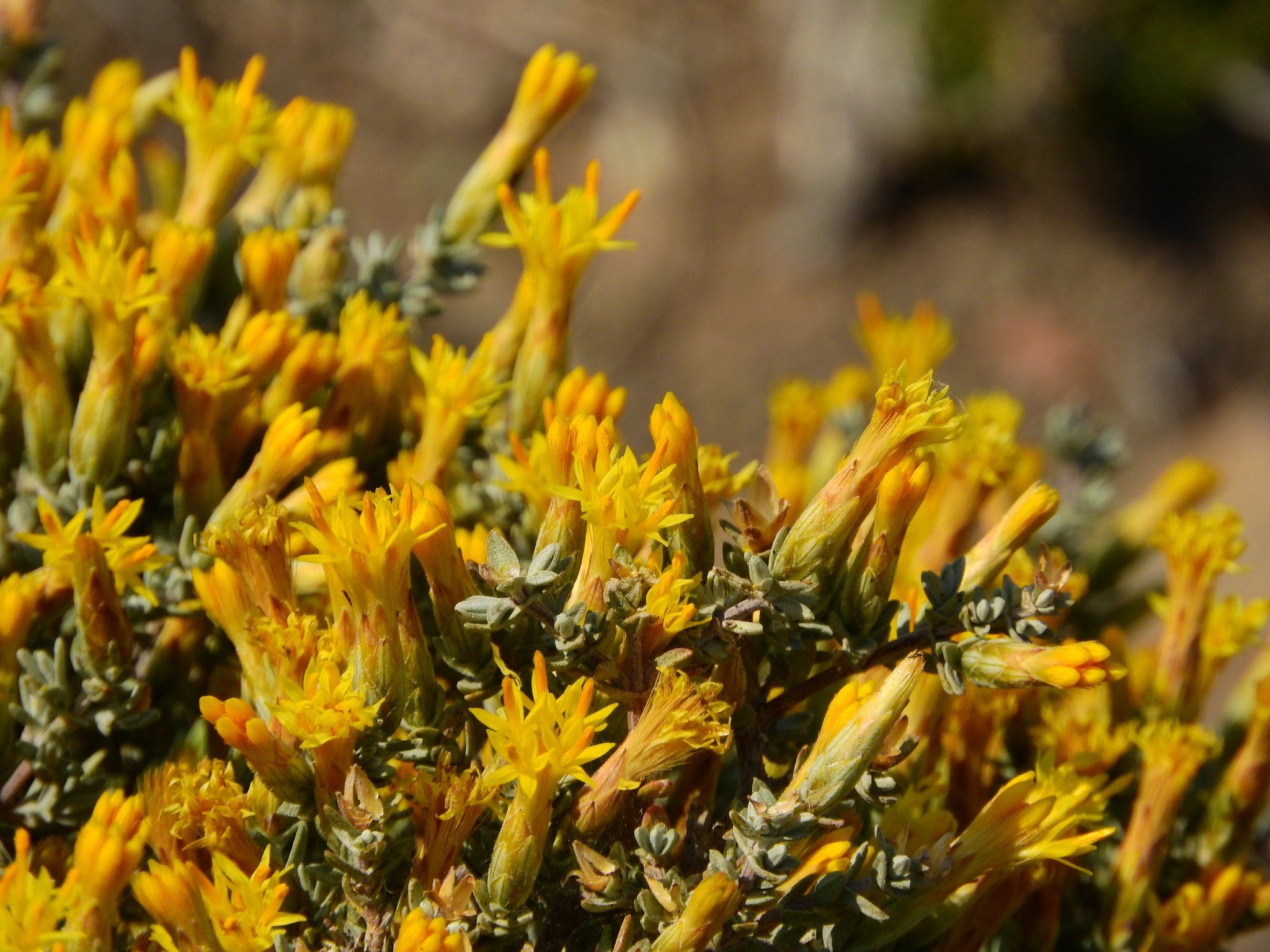

Scientific classification
- Kingdom: Plantae
- Clade: Tracheophytes
- Clade: Angiosperms
- Clade: Eudicots
- Clade: Asterids
- Order: Asterales
- Family: Asteraceae
- Genus: Pteronia
- Species: P. glauca

Binomial name
- Pteronia glauca Thunb.

= Pteronia glauca =

Species of plant

Pteronia glauca ("Geelboegoekaroo") is a species of flowering plant in the family Asteraceae, indigenous to the Karoo regions of South Africa.

== Description ==
A shrub of roughly 60 cm, usually with downwards-drooping outer branches (especially when growing in very rocky ground). Branches can root where they touch the ground. It has small (5x3mm), light grey, woolly, fragrant leaves, and forms a low, dense bush.

The flowerheads appear in Spring, at the tips of the branches. They are yellow and small (5mm wide), with non-sticky yellow bracts.

=== Relatives ===
It often co-occurs with its close relatives, Pteronia paniculata or Pteronia pallens, both of which have distinctive yellow-green leaves. Pteronia incana ("Ash-bush") is a very similar species, which also has light grey leaves. However, unlike P.glauca, its outer branches are not down-curved.

== Distribution and habitat ==
The distribution of this species is across the arid interior Karoo regions of South Africa. It occurs from the Namaqualand, through the Great Karoo and Little Karoo, into the Eastern Cape Province.

Its natural habitat is renosterveld and succulent karoo vegetation, often growing in loamy soils or arid flood plains, with underlying calcrete.
