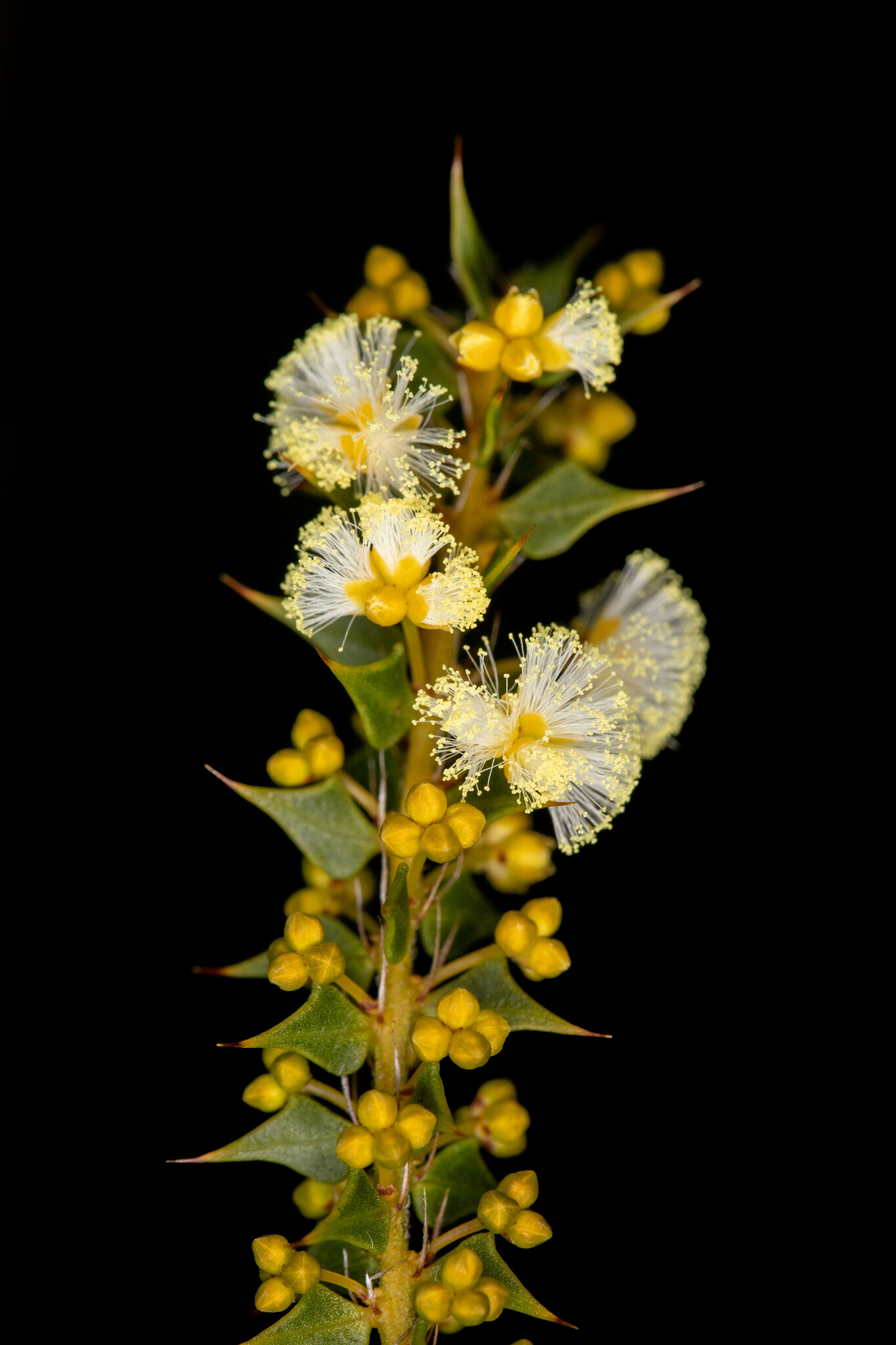
- In Gull Rock National Park

Scientific classification
- Kingdom: Plantae
- Clade: Tracheophytes
- Clade: Angiosperms
- Clade: Eudicots
- Clade: Rosids
- Order: Fabales
- Family: Fabaceae
- Subfamily: Caesalpinioideae
- Clade: Mimosoid clade
- Genus: Acacia
- Species: A. hastulata

Binomial name
- Acacia hastulata Sm.
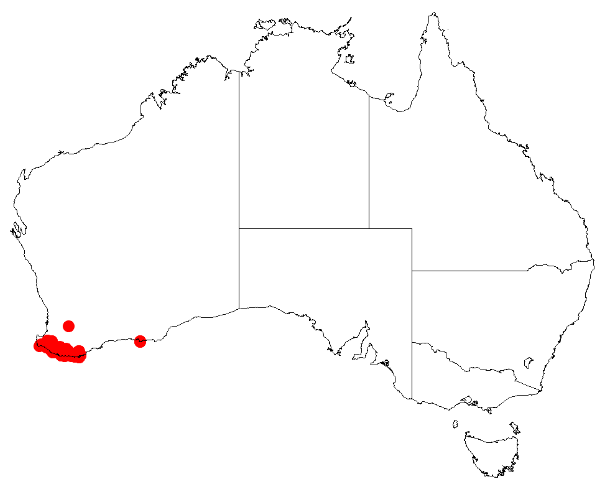
- Occurrence data from AVH

Synonyms
- List: Acacia cordata Steud. nom. inval., nom. nud.; Acacia cordifolia Sweet nom. inval., nom. nud.; Acacia cordifolia Sweet ex Courtois; Acacia cordifolia R.Br. ex Lemon nom. illeg.; Racosperma hastulatum (Sm.) Pedley

= Acacia hastulata =

Species of legume

Acacia hastulata is a species of flowering plant in the family Fabaceae and is endemic to the south-west of Western Australia. It is often an intricate shrub with crowded, sharply pointed, sometimes heart-shaped phyllodes, spherical heads of cream-coloured flowers and terete, curved pods narrowed at both ends.

== Description ==
Acacia hastulata is an often intricate shrub that typically grows to a height of 0.3–2 m (1 ft 0 in – 6 ft 7 in) and often has virgate, arching, reddish to orange-brown branches, and branchlets covered with short, soft hairs. Its phyllodes are crowded, with a rounded lower lobe and a gland-bearing upper lobe, often heart-shaped, 3.5–6 mm (0.14–0.24 in) long, 2–3 mm (0.079–0.118 in) wide and sharply pointed with a prominent central midrib. There are silky hairy, narrowly triangular stipules at the base of the phyllodes. The flowers are borne in a spherical head in axils on a peduncle 2–4 mm (0.079–0.157 in) long, each head with three to five cream-coloured flowers. Flowering mainly occurs from July to November and the pods are terete, curved, up to 55 mm (2.2 in) long and 1.5–2 mm (0.059–0.079 in) wide, red-brown, striated, subglabrous and narrowed at both ends. The seeds are oblong to slightly elliptic, 2.5–3.5 mm (0.098–0.138 in) long with an aril on the end.

== Taxonomy ==
Acacia hastulata was first formally described in 1818 by the botanist James Edward Smith in Abraham Rees work The Cyclopaedia from specimens collected near King George's Sound by Archibald Menzies. The specific epithet (hastulata) is the diminutive form of hastate, referring to the phyllodes.

This species belongs to the Acacia horridula group but is easily distinguished by the shape of its phyllodes.

== Distribution and habitat ==
This species of wattle occurs near the Scott River, south of Nannup, south-east of Albany and near Esperance in the Esperance Plains, Jarrah Forest and Warren bioregions in the south-west of Western Australia. It usually grows in swampy places, often with Melaleuca or Banksia species, and also in karri (Eucalyptus diversicolor) forest.

== Conservation status ==
Acacia hastulata is listed as "not threatened" by the Government of Western Australia Department of Biodiversity, Conservation and Attractions.

== See also ==
- List of Acacia species
