= Goodenia elderi =

Scientific classification
- Kingdom: Plantae
- Clade: Tracheophytes
- Clade: Angiosperms
- Clade: Eudicots
- Clade: Asterids
- Order: Asterales
- Family: Goodeniaceae
- Genus: Goodenia
- Species: G. elderi

Binomial name
- Goodenia elderi F.Muell. & Tate

Species of plant

Goodenia elderi is a species of flowering plant in the family Goodeniaceae and is endemic to inland areas of Western Australia. It is an erect or virgate shrub with linear, more or less bunched stem leaves, and spreading racemes of white or yellow flowers.

== Description ==
Goodenia elderi is an erect or virgate shrub that typically grows to a height of 0.3–1 m (1 ft 0 in – 3 ft 3 in). It has linear, more or less bunched stem leaves 5–20 mm (0.20–0.79 in) long and 1–1.5 mm (0.039–0.059 in) wide. The flowers are arranged in spreading racemes or thyrses 40–120 mm (1.6–4.7 in) long on a peduncle up to 20 mm (0.79 in) long with linear bracts up to 5 mm (0.20 in) long at the base. Each flower is on a pedicel up to 12 mm (0.47 in) long with linear bracteoles up to 2 mm (0.079 in) long. The sepals are linear, 4–6 mm (0.16–0.24 in) long, the corolla white or yellow, 9–11 mm (0.35–0.43 in) long. The lower lobe of the corolla is up to 7 mm (0.28 in) long with wings about 1 mm (0.039 in) wide. Flowering mainly occurs from September to January and the fruit is an elliptic capsule 5–6 mm (0.20–0.24 in) long.

== Taxonomy and naming ==
Goodenia elderi was first formally described in 1874 by Ferdinand von Mueller and Ralph Tate in the journal Botanisches Centralblatt from material collected "on sandy places near Warangering" during an expedition funder by Thomas Elder. The specific epithet (elderi) honours Thomas Elder.

== Distribution and habitat ==
This goodenia grows in sandy soil between Karalee west of Coolgardie and Queen Victoria Spring north of Zanthus in the Coolgardie, Great Victoria Desert, Murchison, Nullarbor and Yalgoo biogeographic regions of inland Western Australia.

== Conservation status ==
Goodenia elderi is classified as "not threatened" by the Government of Western Australia Department of Parks and Wildlife.
