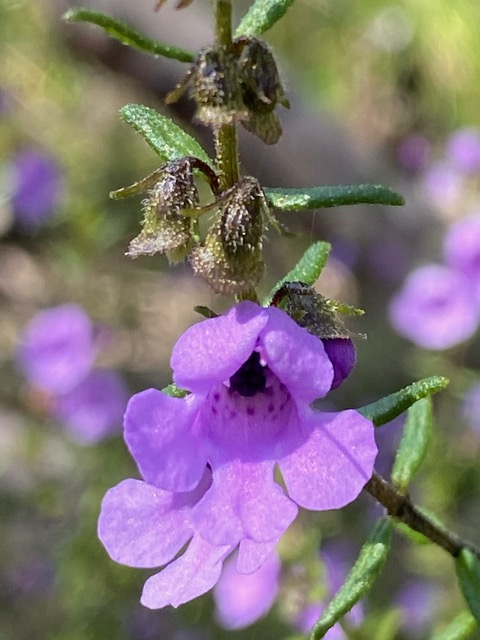

Scientific classification
- Kingdom: Plantae
- Clade: Tracheophytes
- Clade: Angiosperms
- Clade: Eudicots
- Clade: Asterids
- Order: Lamiales
- Family: Lamiaceae
- Genus: Prostanthera
- Species: P. howelliae

Binomial name
- Prostanthera howelliae Blakely
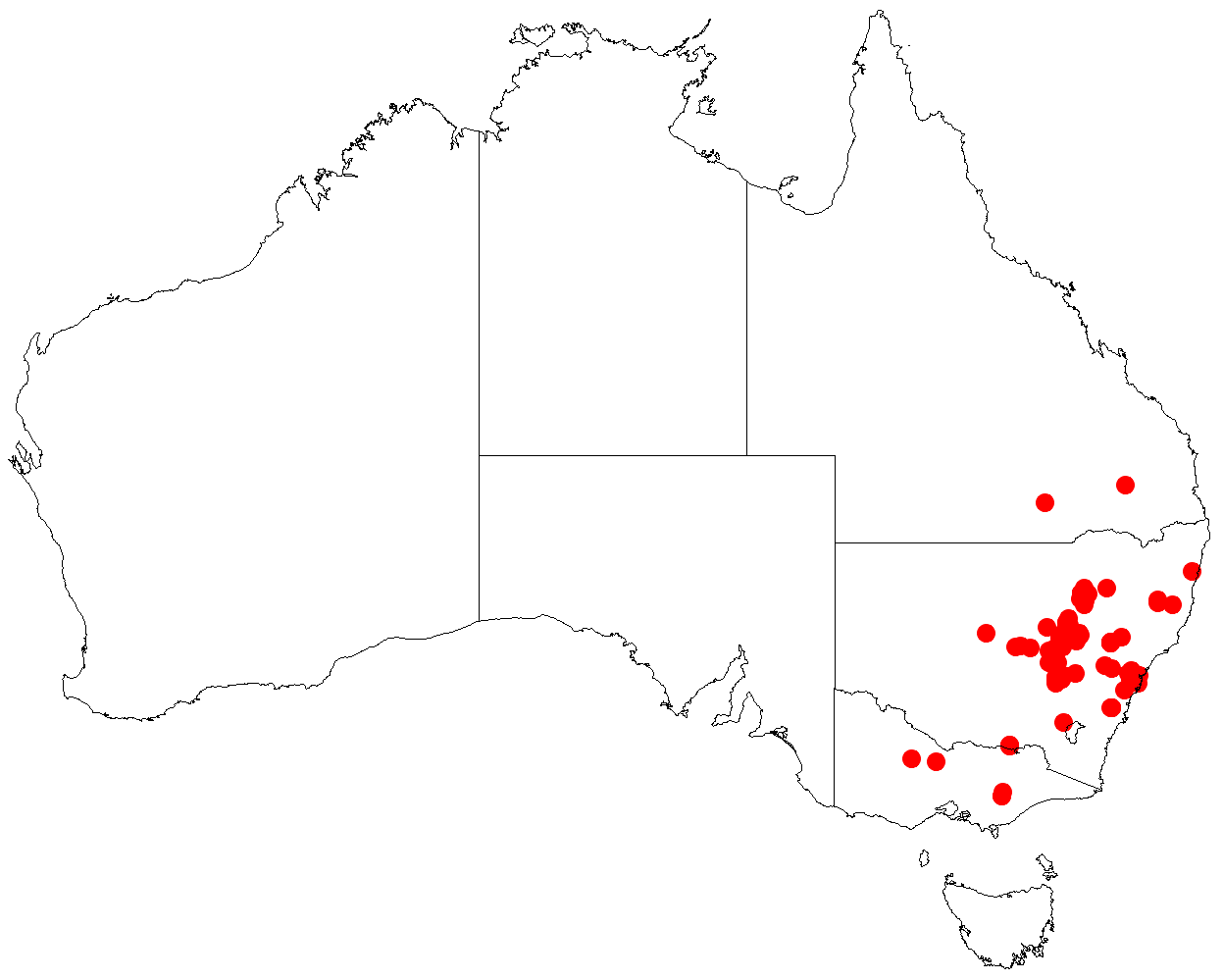
- Occurrence data from AVH

= Prostanthera howelliae =

Species of flowering plant

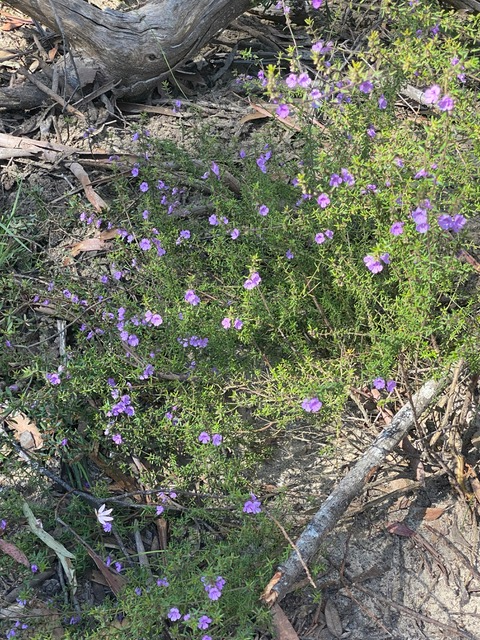
Habit

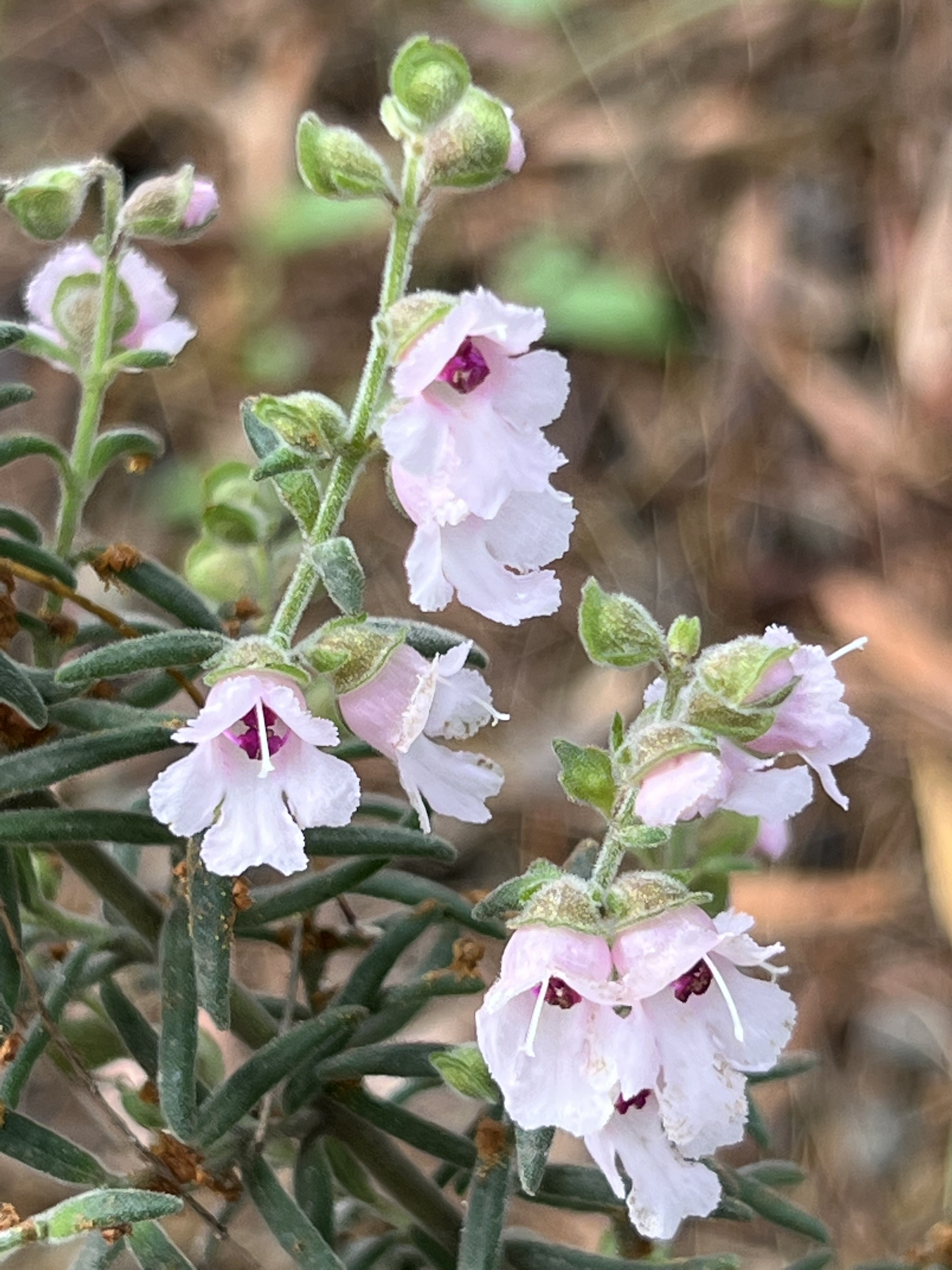
Pink form

Prostanthera howelliae is a flowering plant in the mint family Lamiaceae and is endemic to New South Wales and Queensland. It is a small shrub with narrow stems, aromatic, hairy leaves and pink, purple or violet, tube-shaped flowers.

== Description ==
Prostanthera howelliae is an erect or spreading, virgate shrub which grows to a height and spread of 0.3–1.5 m (1–5 ft) with its branches densely covered with short hairs. The leaves have a fragrant odour when crushed, and are narrow egg-shaped, 2.5–10 mm (0.1–0.4 in) long, 0.5–1.5 mm (0.02–0.06 in) wide with their edges turned under. The leaves have a very short stalk, sometimes a maroon tinge and are covered with short, cone-shaped hairs.

The flowers are arranged singly in leaf axils with two bracteoles at their base, the bracteoles leaf-like, linear in shape, about 1.5 mm (0.06 in) long and remaining on the plant after flowering. The tube formed by the sepals is 4–5 mm (0.16–0.20 in) long, with the tubular part about 2 mm (0.08 in) long. The petal tube is 8–10 mm (0.3–0.4 in) long, pink to purple-mauve and spotted inside the tube. As with many other prostantheras, the petal tube has two "lips" with the upper one having two lobes and the lower one three lobes. Flowering occurs in spring.

== Taxonomy and naming ==
The species was first formally described in 1929 by William Blakely and the description was published in Proceedings of the Linnean Society of New South Wales. The specific epithet (howelliae) honours "Mrs. T.J. Howell, who, for a number of years, has taken a keen interest in the native flora".

== Distribution and habitat ==
This prostanthera grows in woodland and shrubland, often in gravelly or sandy soil, in the eastern half of New South Wales and in Queensland.
