= Acacia pycnocephala =

Scientific classification
- Kingdom: Plantae
- Clade: Tracheophytes
- Clade: Angiosperms
- Clade: Eudicots
- Clade: Rosids
- Order: Fabales
- Family: Fabaceae
- Subfamily: Caesalpinioideae
- Clade: Mimosoid clade
- Genus: Acacia
- Species: A. pycnocephala

Binomial name
- Acacia pycnocephala Maslin
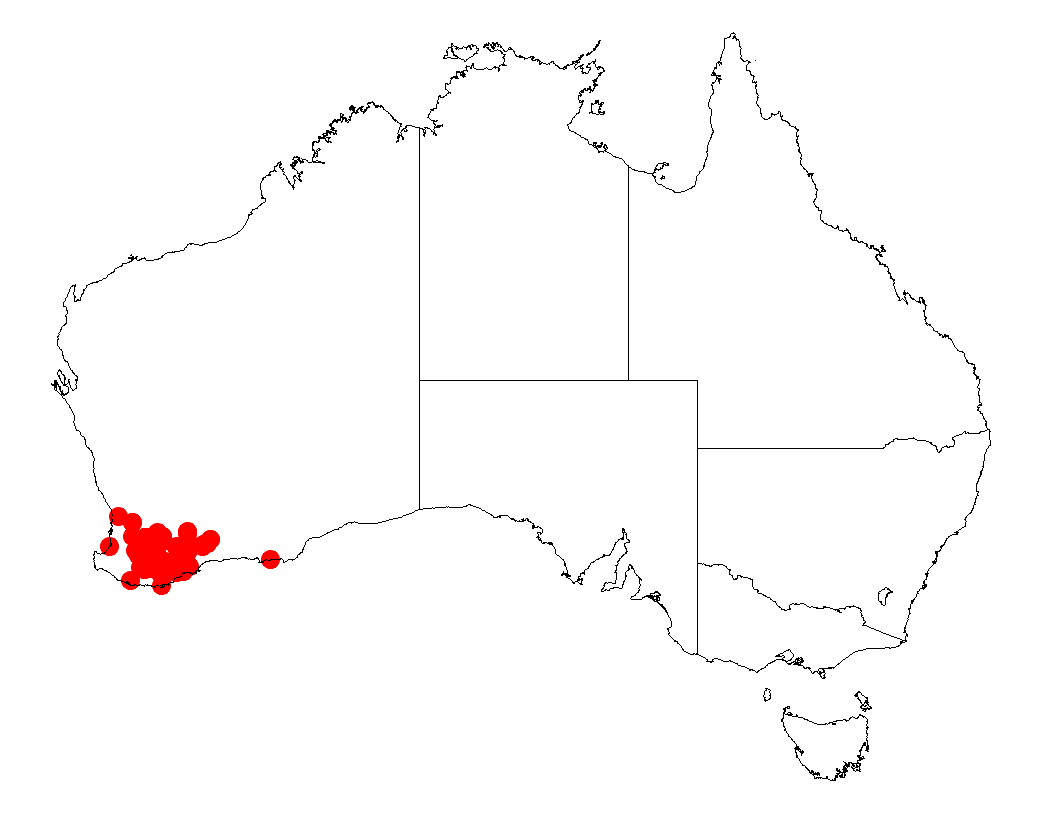
- Occurrence data from AVH

Species of legume

Acacia pycnocephala is a shrub of the genus Acacia and the subgenus Phyllodineae that is endemic to south western Australia.

== Description ==
The slender prickly shrub typically grows to a height of 0.25 to 0.6 metres (0.8 to 2.0 ft) and has an erect or spreading habit. It has orange to reddish brown coloured branches and hairy branchlets with narrowly triangular to setaceous 2 to 4 mm (0.079 to 0.157 in) long stipules. Like most species of Acacia it has phyllodes rather than true leaves. The glabrous, rigid, pungent and olive green coloured phyllodes appear quite crowded on the branchlets and are trowel shaped with a length of 6 to 11 mm (0.24 to 0.43 in) and a width of 1.5 to 4 mm (0.059 to 0.157 in) with a prominent midrib and absent lateral nerves. It blooms from May to September and produces yellow flowers. The simple inflorescences simple occur singly in the axils and have spherical flower heads containing four golden coloured flowers. Following flowering seed pods form that are curved and narrow abruptly at each end with a length of up to 4.5 cm (1.8 in) and a diameter of around 3 mm (0.12 in). The striated pods are a red-brown colour and have small hairs. The seeds inside are arranged longitudinally and have an oblong to elliptic shape with a length of 3.5 to 4.5 mm (0.14 to 0.18 in) and a conical aril.

== Taxonomy ==
The shrub belongs to the Acacia horridula group of wattles.

== Distribution ==
It is native to an area in the Wheatbelt, Great Southern, South West and Goldfields-Esperance regions of Western Australia where it is found growing in sandy or loamy soils derived or containing laterite. The range of the plant extends from around Narrogin in the north west to Rocky Gully in the south west out to Beaufort Inlet in the south east and Lake King in the north east as a part of many communities but most often in Mallee shrubland or open Eucalyptus wandoo woodlands.

== See also ==
- List of Acacia species
