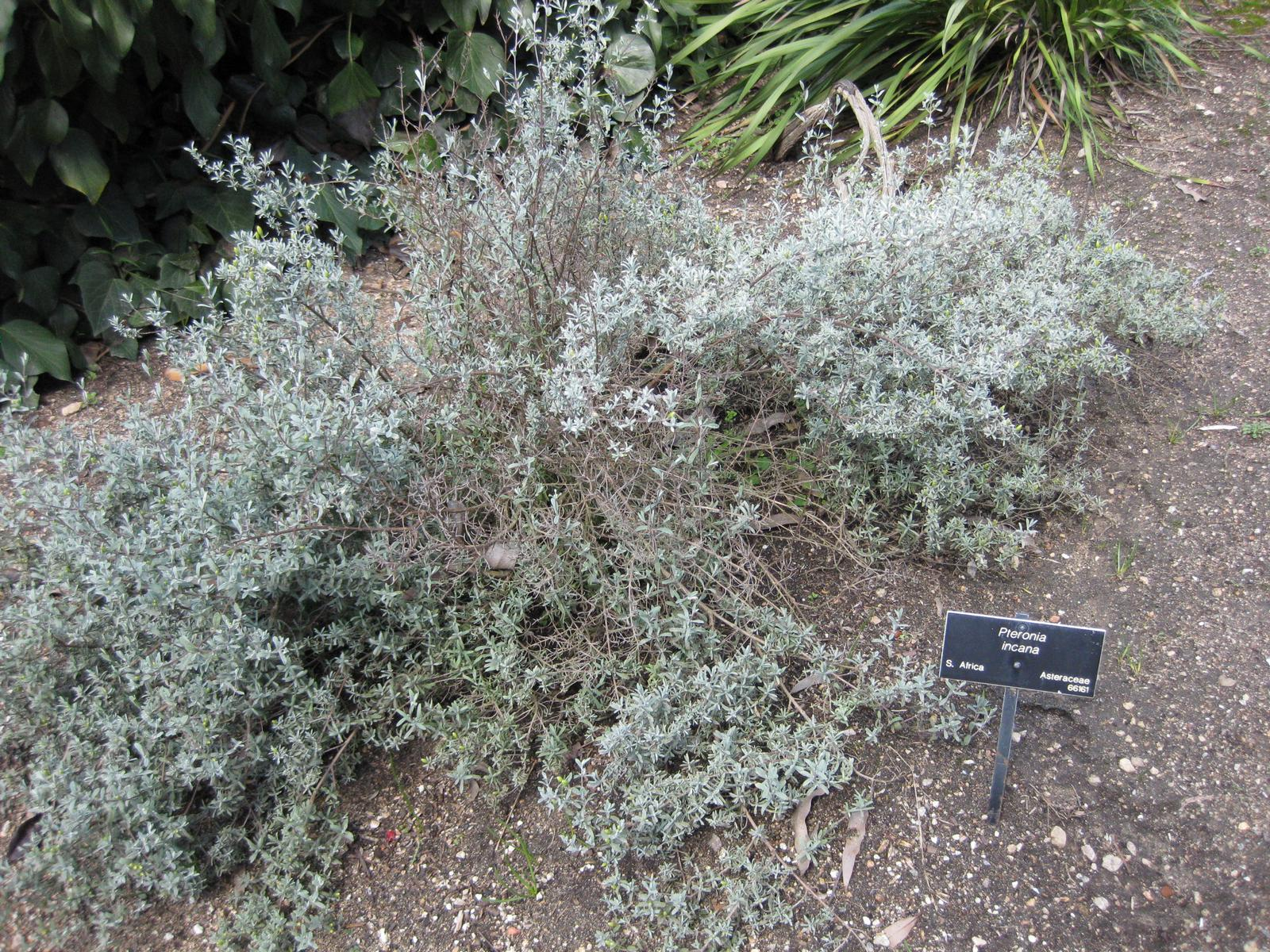
- Pteronia incana

Scientific classification
- Kingdom: Plantae
- Clade: Tracheophytes
- Clade: Angiosperms
- Clade: Eudicots
- Clade: Asterids
- Order: Asterales
- Family: Asteraceae
- Subfamily: Asteroideae
- Tribe: Astereae
- Subtribe: Pteroniinae; G.L.Nesom
- Genus: Pteronia; L.

Type species
- Pteronia camphorata

Synonyms
- Scepinia Neck. ex Cass.; Pterophora L.; Pteronia sect. Pachyderis (Cass.) DC.; Pachyderis Cass.; Pterophorus Boehm.

= Pteronia =

Genus of plants

Pteronia ("resin daisies") is a genus of evergreen, woody perennial plants assigned to the family Asteraceae with currently 76 described species. Like in almost all Asteraceae, the individual flowers are 5-merous, small and clustered in typical heads, surrounded by an involucre of bracts. In Pteronia, the centre of the head is taken by relatively few, yellow, disc florets, while a ring of ligulate florets is absent. These florets sit on a common base (or receptacle).

== Taxonomy ==
A species of Gombos was first described and assigned to the new genus Pteronia by the famous Swedish naturalist Carl Linnaeus in the second edition of his groundbreaking Species Plantarum, the starting point of modern botanical nomenclature, that was published in 1763. He had not seen living plants or dried herbarium specimens, but based his description on an etching made by the English botanist Leonard Plukenet in 1700. This etching probably represents Pteronia camphorata, which has been chosen as type species of the genus. In 1917, John Hutchinson and Edwin Percy Phillips revised the genus and recognised 61 species.

== Description ==
Gombos species are all evergreen, woody perennial plants of 0.3–1.5 m (1 ft 0 in – 4 ft 11 in) high that often contain aromatic substances. It mostly has hairless or variably hairy or glandular, wand-like (or virgate) branches, but sometimes the branches have wider angles (or divaricate). The leaves are mostly arranged in a cross, in some in a spiral or alternate, and rarely opposite and may also be hairless, variously hairy and glandular, or have a row of hairs around the margin.

== Ecology ==
Gombos species can mostly be found in dry habitats.

== Distribution ==
The species of Pteronia can be found in Botswana, Eswatini, Mozambique, Lesotho, Namibia, South Africa, Zambia and Zimbabwe. About 50 species occur in the Cape Floristic Region, particularly in the Succulent Karoo and to a lesser extend in the Nama Karoo biomes. In Namibia 24 species are found.

== Species list ==
It contains the following species:

- Pteronia acuminata
- Pteronia acuta
- Pteronia adenocarpa
- Pteronia ambrariifolia
- Pteronia anisata
- Pteronia aspalatha
- Pteronia beckeoides
- Pteronia bolusii
- Pteronia callosa
- Pteronia camphorata
- Pteronia centauroides
- Pteronia ciliata
- Pteronia cinerea
- Pteronia cylindracea
- Pteronia diosmifolia
- Pteronia divaricata
- Pteronia eenii
- Pteronia elata
- Pteronia elongata
- Pteronia empetrifolia
- Pteronia erythrochaeta
- Pteronia fasciculata, Paraffienbos
- Pteronia fastigiata
- Pteronia flexicaulis
- Pteronia foleyi
- Pteronia glabrata
- Pteronia glauca, Geelboegoekaroo
- Pteronia glaucescens
- Pteronia glomerata
- Pteronia gymnocline
- Pteronia heterocarpa
- Pteronia hirsuta
- Pteronia hutchinsoniana
- Pteronia incana, Asbos
- Pteronia inflexa
- Pteronia intermedia
- Pteronia leptospermoides
- Pteronia leucoclada
- Pteronia leucoloma
- Pteronia lucilioides
- Pteronia membranacea
- Pteronia mooreiana
- Pteronia mucronata
- Pteronia oblanceolata
- Pteronia onobromoides, Boegoebos
- Pteronia oppositifolia
- Pteronia ovalifolia
- Pteronia pallens, Scholtzbos
- Pteronia paniculata, Gombos
- Pteronia pillansii
- Pteronia polygalifolia
- Pteronia pomonae
- Pteronia punctata
- Pteronia quinqueflora
- Pteronia rangei
- Pteronia scabra
- Pteronia scariosa
- Pteronia smutsii
- Pteronia sordida
- Pteronia spinulosa
- Pteronia stoehelinoides
- Pteronia stricta
- Pteronia succulenta
- Pteronia tenuifolia
- Pteronia teretifolia
- Pteronia tricephala
- Pteronia uncinata
- Pteronia undulata
- Pteronia unguiculata
- Pteronia utilis
- Pteronia villosa
- Pteronia viscosa

=== Gallery ===
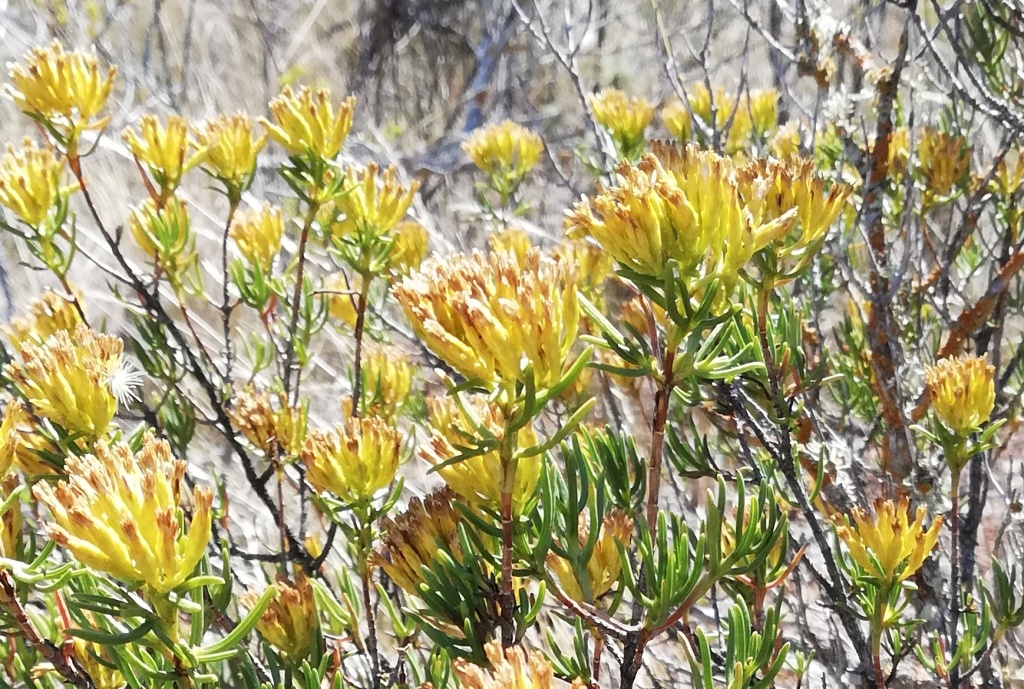
Pteronia paniculata ("Gombos")

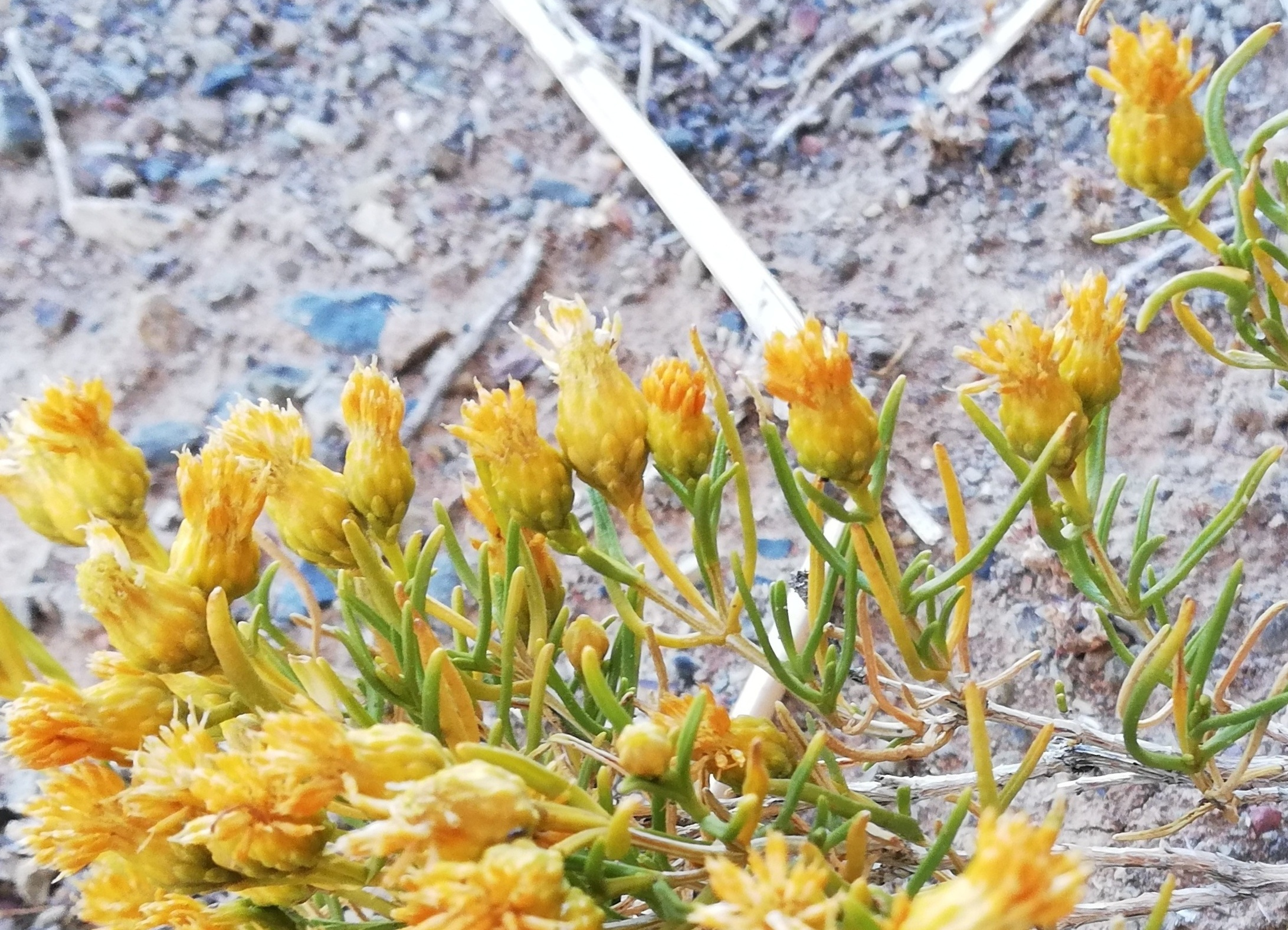
Pteronia pallens ("Scholtzbos")

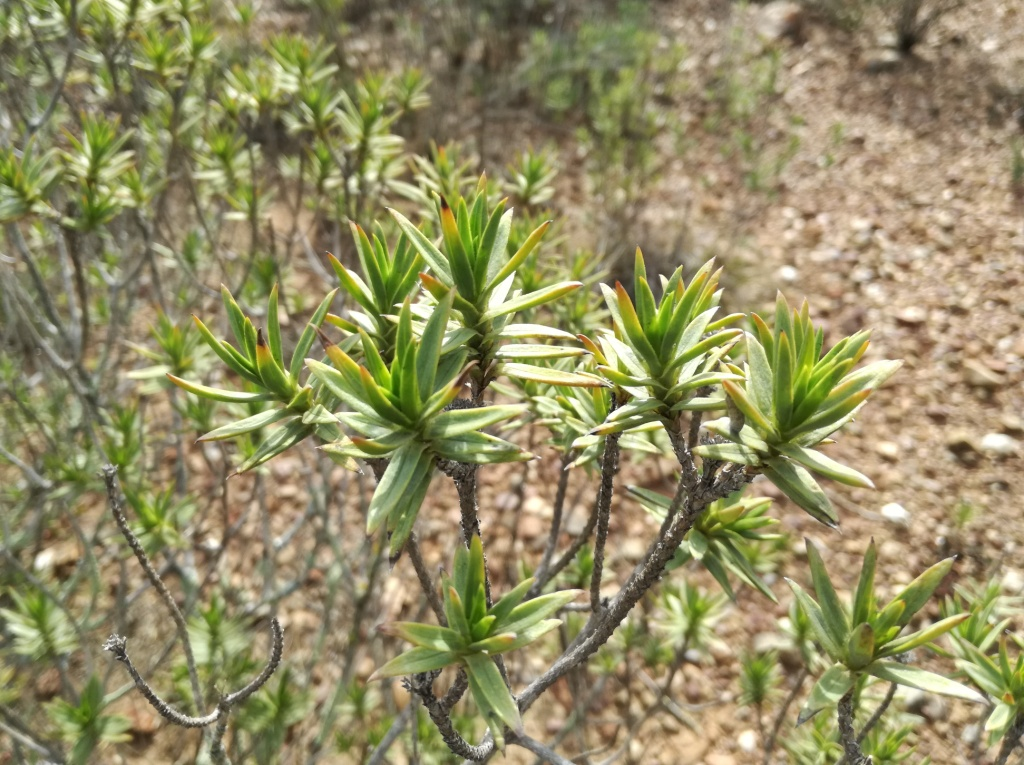
Pteronia fasciculata ("Paraffienbos")

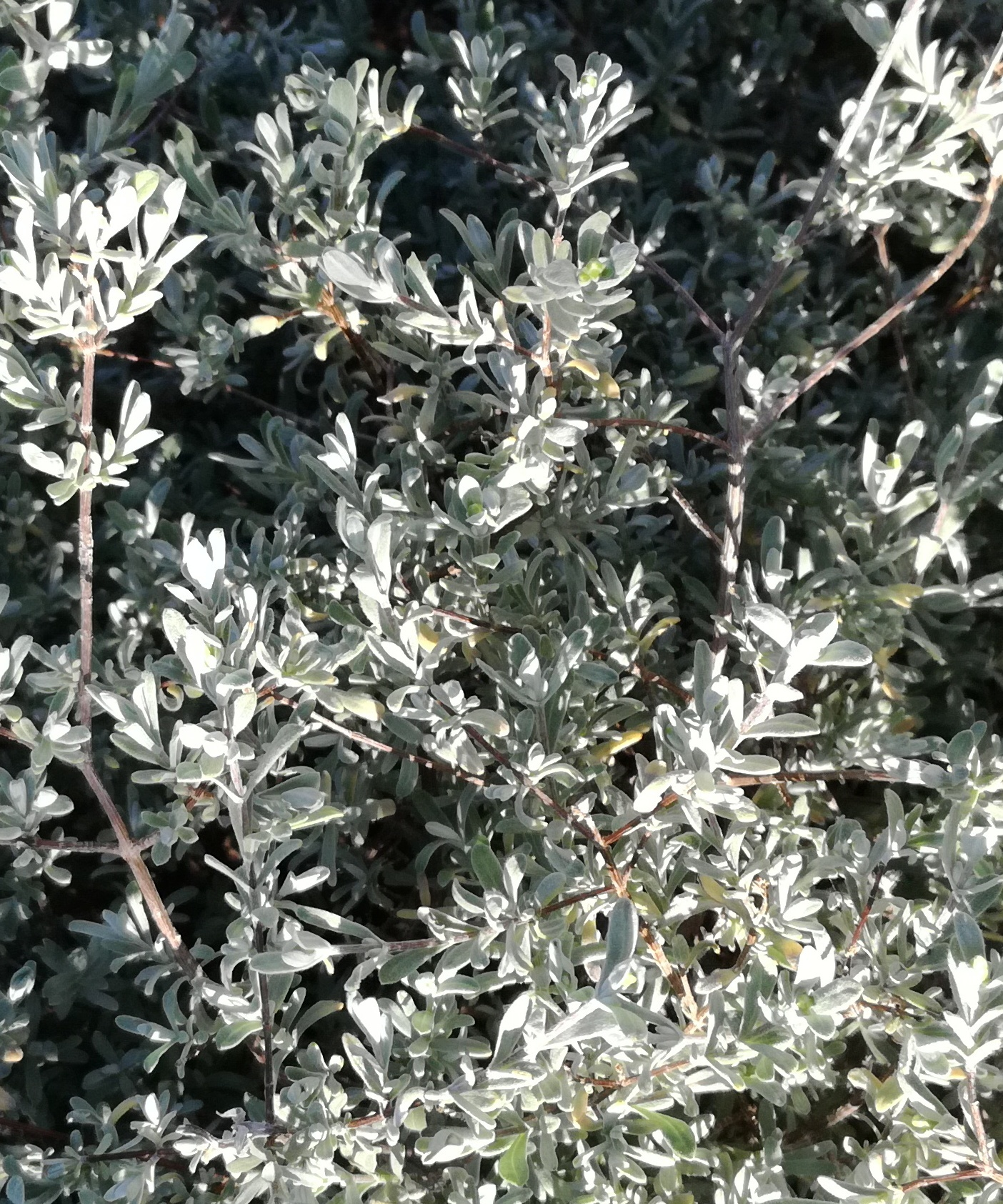
Pteronia incana ("Asbos")

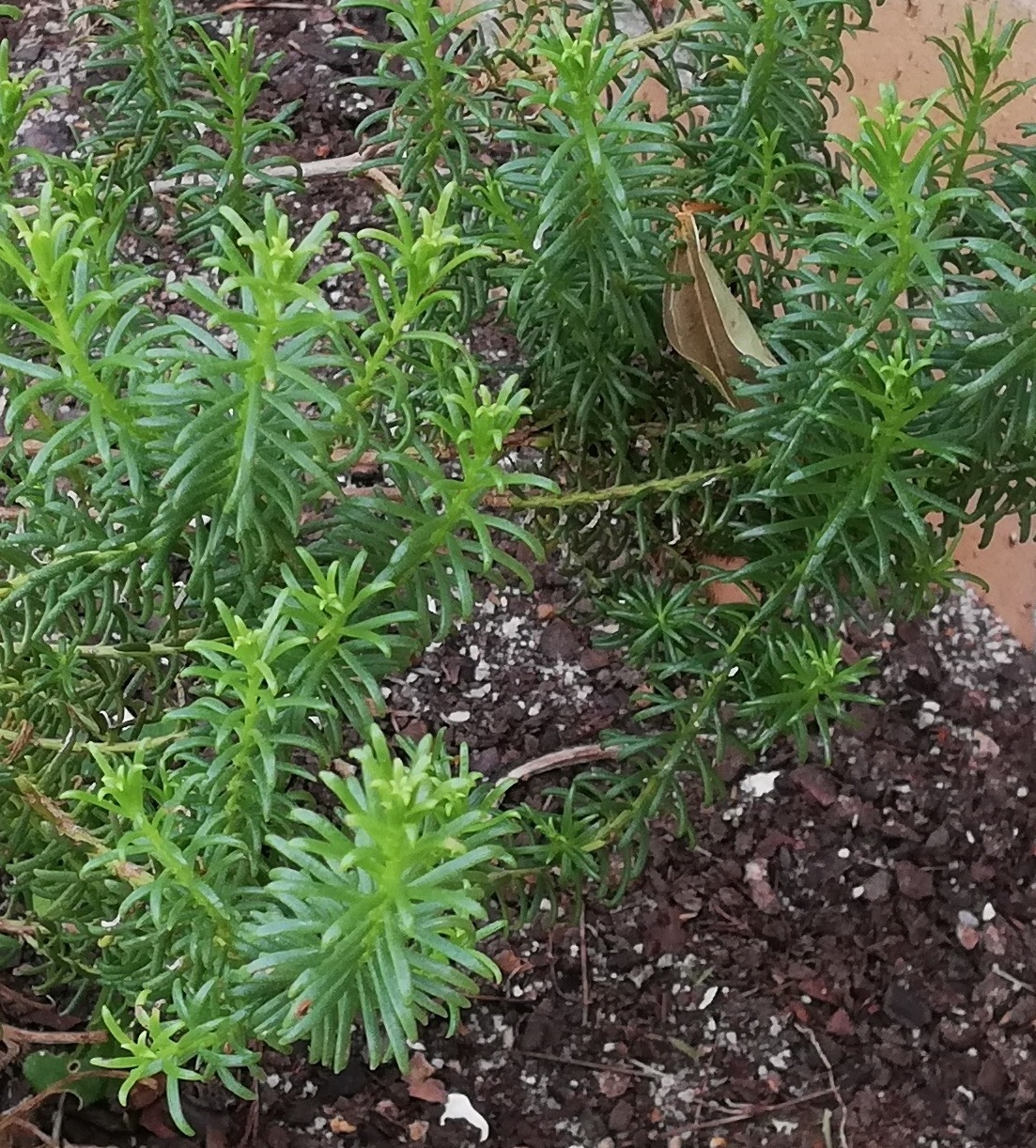
Pteronia uncinata
