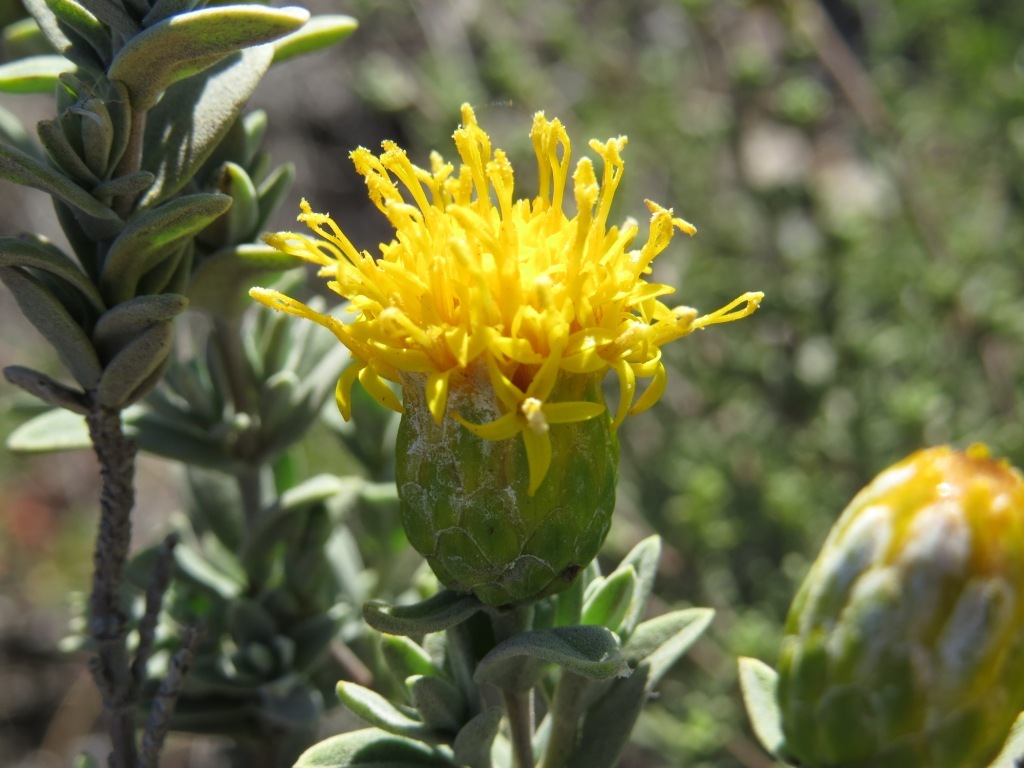

Scientific classification
- Kingdom: Plantae
- Clade: Tracheophytes
- Clade: Angiosperms
- Clade: Eudicots
- Clade: Asterids
- Order: Asterales
- Family: Asteraceae
- Genus: Pteronia
- Species: P. oppositifolia

Binomial name
- Pteronia oppositifolia L. (1767)

Synonyms
- Chrysocoma oppositifolia L. (1760); Pachyderis oblongifolia Steud. (1841), not validly publ.; Pachyderis obtusifolia Cass. (1828); Pteronia leptolepis DC. (1836); Pteronia oppositifolia E.Mey. ex DC. (1836); Scepinia dichotoma Cass. (1827)

= Pteronia oppositifolia =

Species of plant

Pteronia oppositifolia is a species of flowering plant in the family Asteraceae, indigenous to the western Little Karoo and Overberg regions in the Cape Provinces of South Africa.

== Description ==
A shrub of roughly 30 cm. It has small (5x3mm) leaves that are light grey and woolly underneath.

The flowerheads appear in Spring. They are yellow, 10mm wide, with sticky, yellow-green bracts.

== Distribution and habitat ==
The distribution of this species is confined to the western Little Karoo as far north as Touws River and Anysberg, as well as the Overberg region, as far east as Mossel Bay.

Its natural habitat is dry, stony, clay-rich soils.
