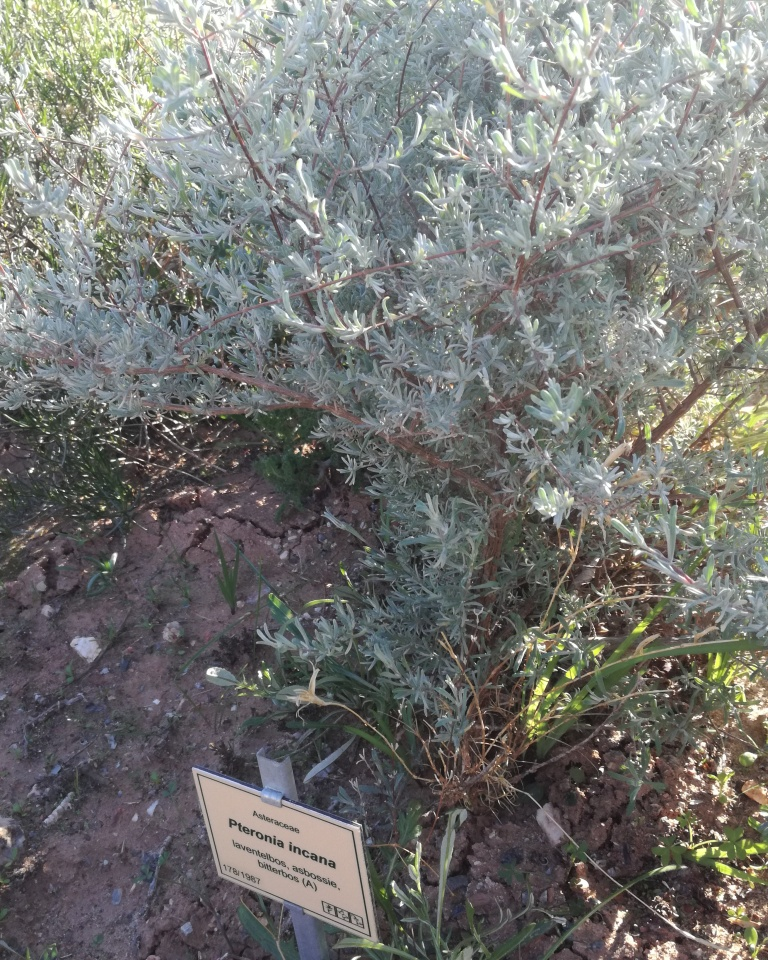
- An "ashbush" (Pteronia incana) in cultivation

Scientific classification
- Kingdom: Plantae
- Clade: Tracheophytes
- Clade: Angiosperms
- Clade: Eudicots
- Clade: Asterids
- Order: Asterales
- Family: Asteraceae
- Genus: Pteronia
- Species: P. incana

Binomial name
- Pteronia incana (Burm.) DC.

= Pteronia incana =

Species of plant

Pteronia incana ("Asbos" or "ash-bush") is a species of flowering plant in the family Asteraceae, indigenous to the Karoo regions of South Africa.

== Description ==
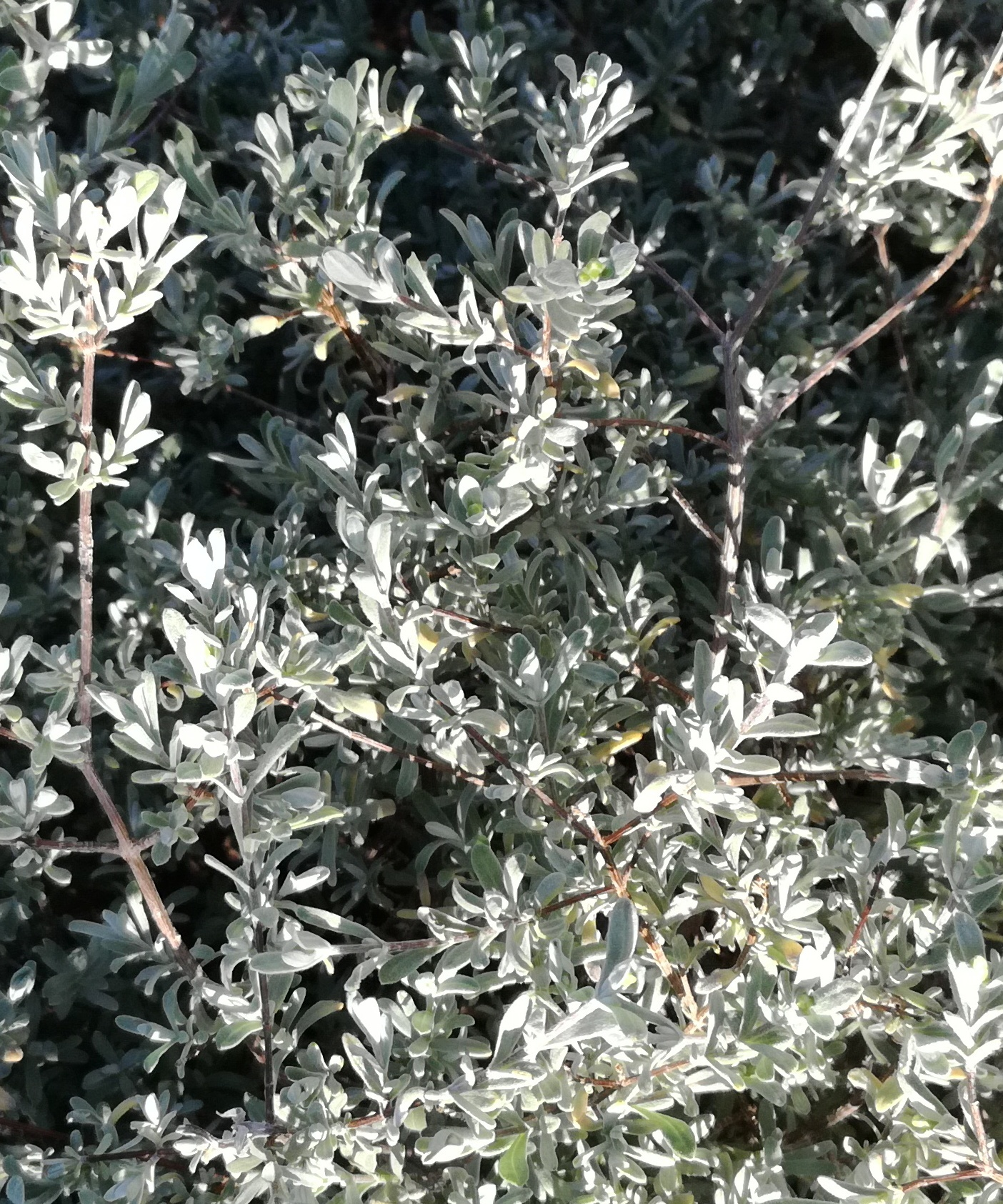
Leaf detail

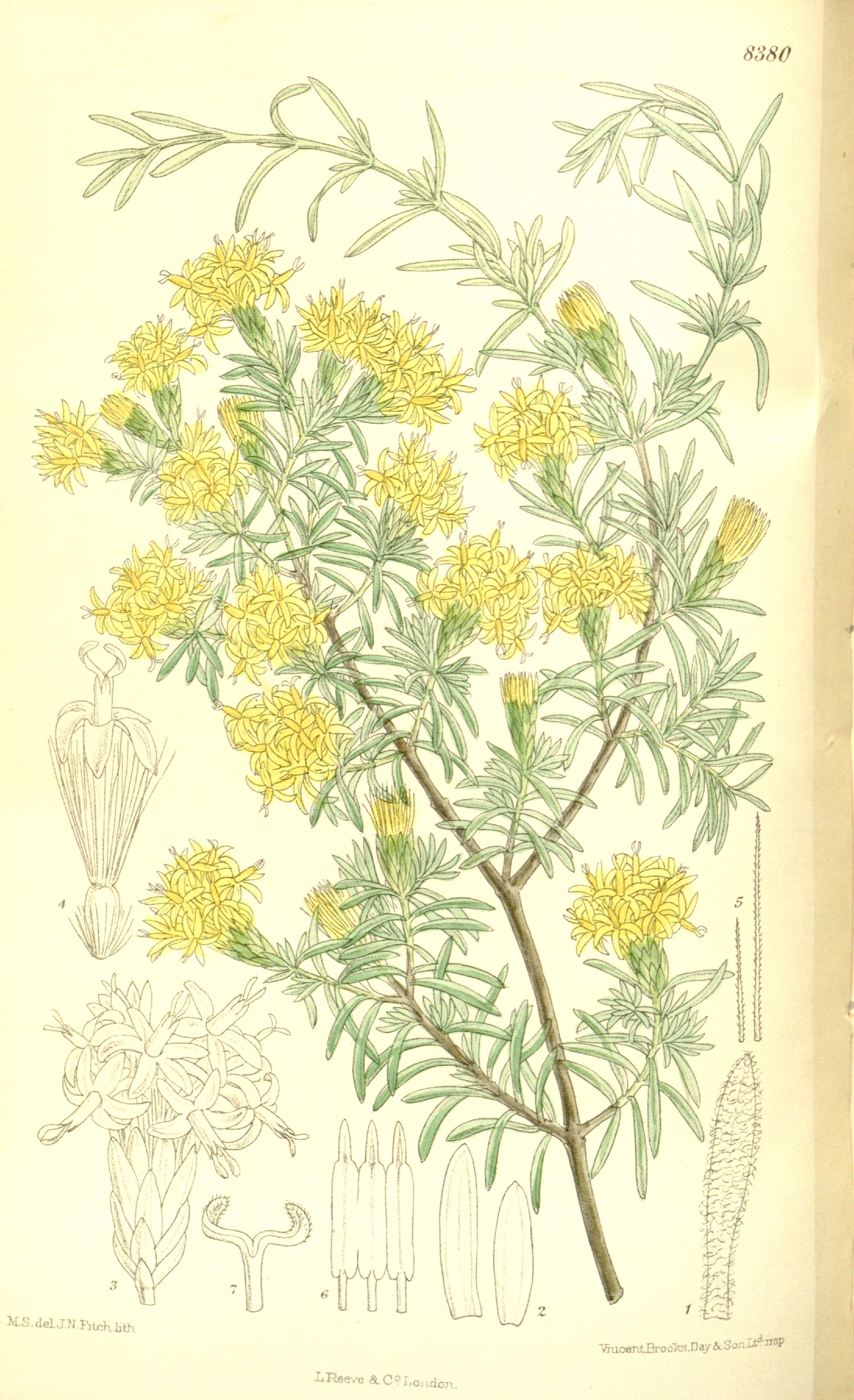
Botanical illustration of Pteronia incana flowers.

This species has small, light grey, woolly, fragrant leaves, and forms a low, dense bush. Its fragrant leaves have a variety of medicinal uses.

The flowerheads appear in Spring, at the tips of the branches. They are solitary, yellow, 15mm wide, with non-sticky yellow-green bracts, and small of coconut.

=== Relatives ===
It often co-occurs with its close relatives, Pteronia paniculata or Pteronia pallens, both of which have distinctive yellow-green leaves.

Pteronia glauca ("Boegoekaroo") is a very similar species, which also has light grey leaves. However, unlike P.incana, its outer branches are always down-turned.

== Distribution and habitat ==
The distribution of this species is in the south-western Cape of South Africa. It occurs throughout the Little Karoo and Robertson Karoo, northwards through the Tanqua and Ceres Karoo, into the Namaqualand. Its range extends southwards into the Overberg region, especially along the broader region of the Breede river valley. Its range also extends eastwards into the Eastern Cape Province.

Its natural habitat is renosterveld vegetation, growing in deep, silty (often clay-rich) soils that are usually derived from shales.
