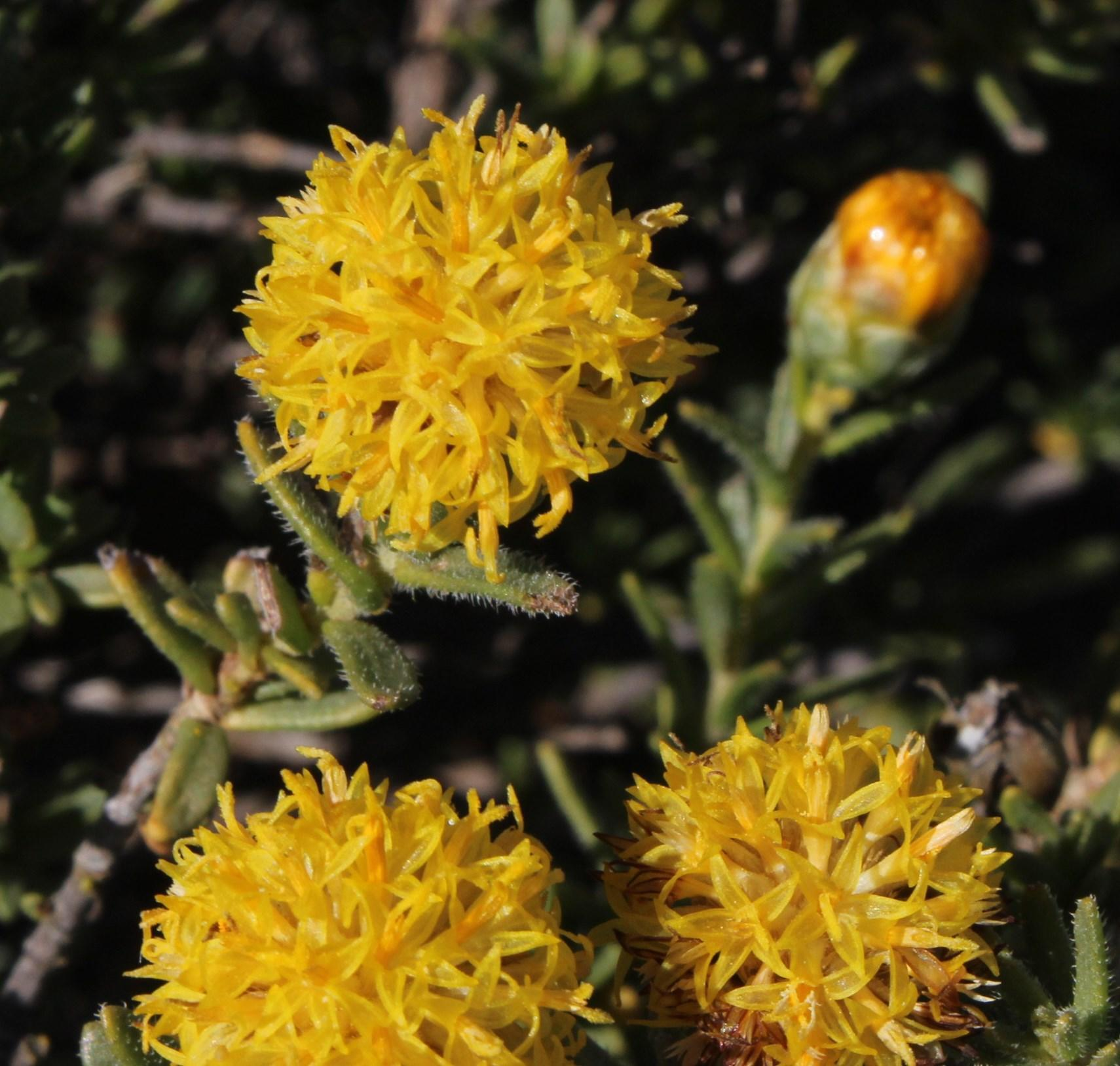

Conservation status
- Least Concern (SANBI Red List)

Scientific classification
- Kingdom: Plantae
- Clade: Tracheophytes
- Clade: Angiosperms
- Clade: Eudicots
- Clade: Asterids
- Order: Asterales
- Family: Asteraceae
- Genus: Pteronia
- Species: P. villosa

Binomial name
- Pteronia villosa L.f.

= Pteronia villosa =

Plant endemic to Namaqualand

Pteronia villosa is a species of evergreen, woody, perennial plants in the genus Pteronia. It is endemic to the Namaqualand region of Southern Africa.

== Distribution ==
Pteronia villosa is found in Namibia and the Northern Cape.

== Conservation status ==
Pteronia villosa is classified as Least Concern.

== Gallery ==
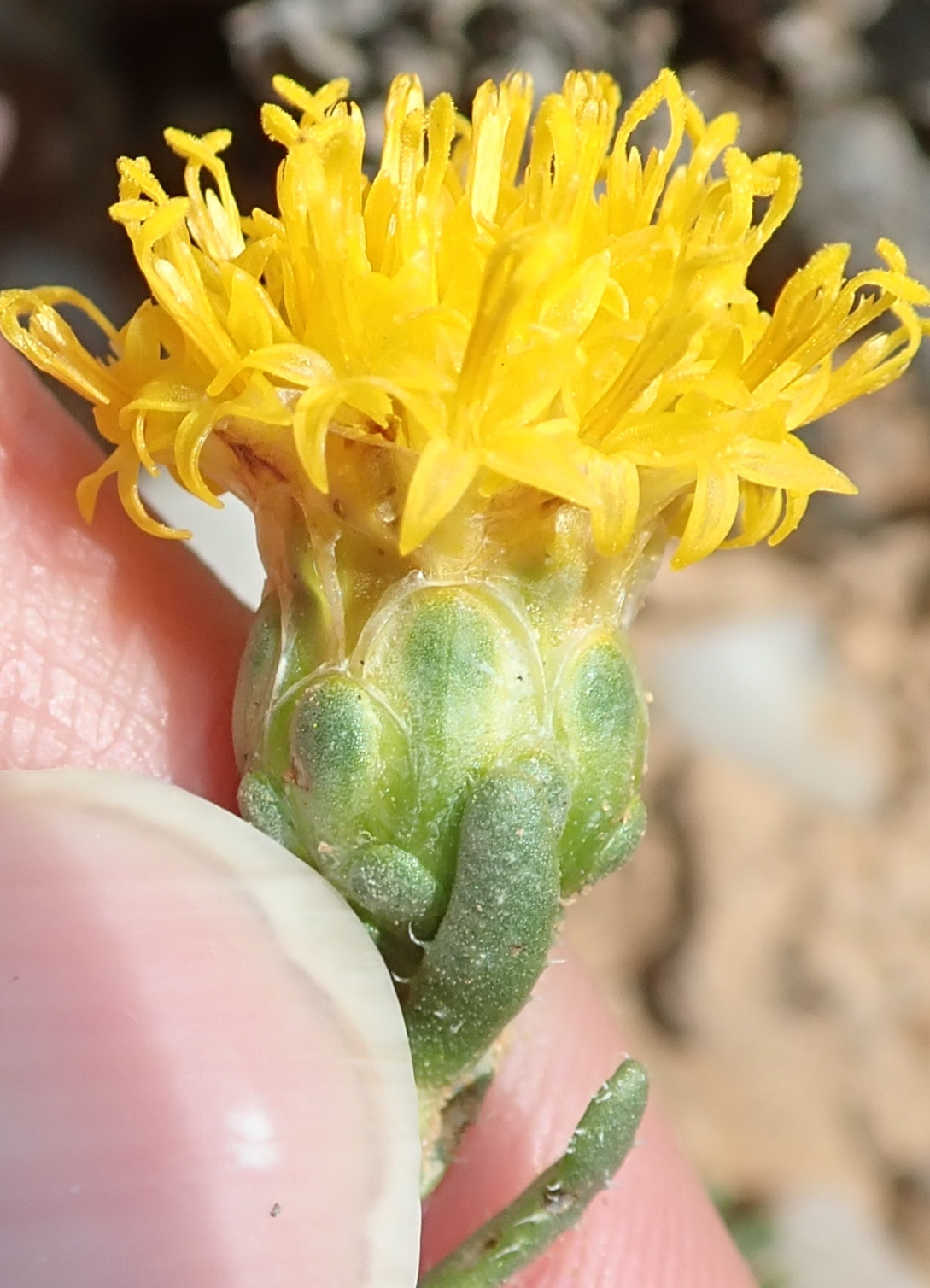

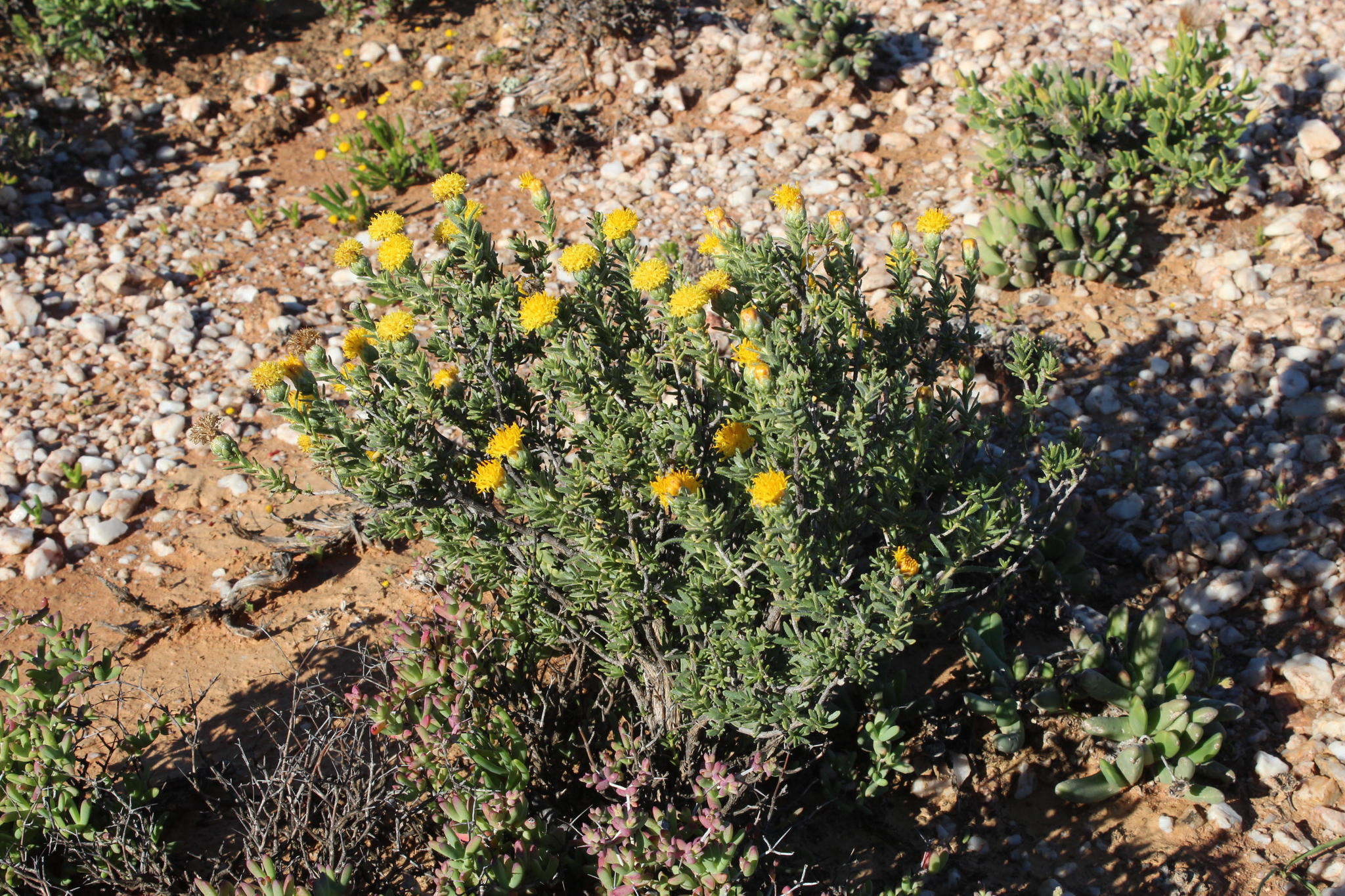
