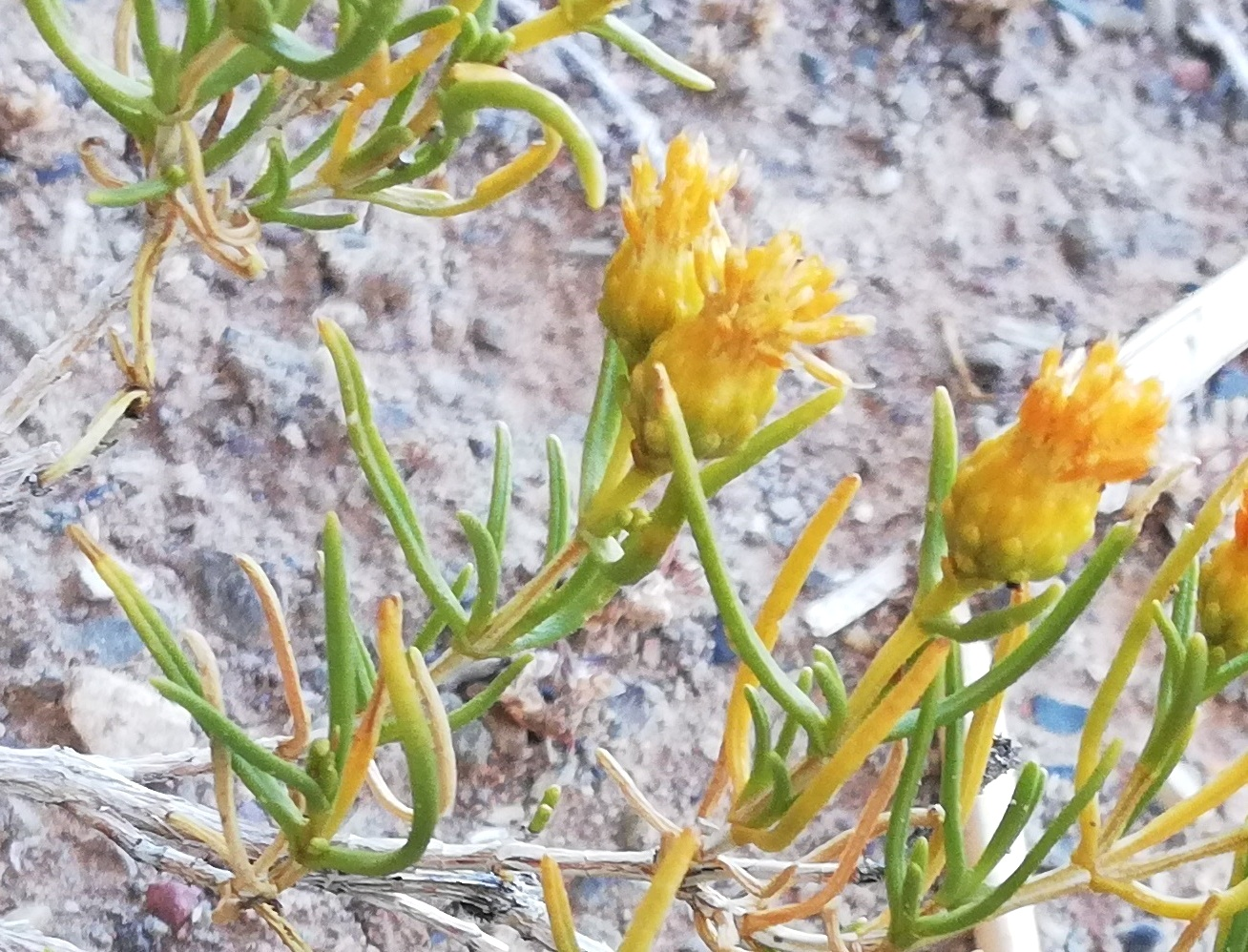

Scientific classification
- Kingdom: Plantae
- Clade: Tracheophytes
- Clade: Angiosperms
- Clade: Eudicots
- Clade: Asterids
- Order: Asterales
- Family: Asteraceae
- Genus: Pteronia
- Species: P. pallens

Binomial name
- Pteronia pallens L.f.

= Pteronia pallens =

Species of plant

Pteronia pallens ("Scholtzbos" or "Aasvoëlbos / Witbas") is a species of flowering plant in the family Asteraceae, indigenous to the Karoo regions of South Africa. Its natural habitat is dry, rocky slopes. It often cooccurs with its close relatives, Pteronia paniculata or Pteronia incana.

== Description ==
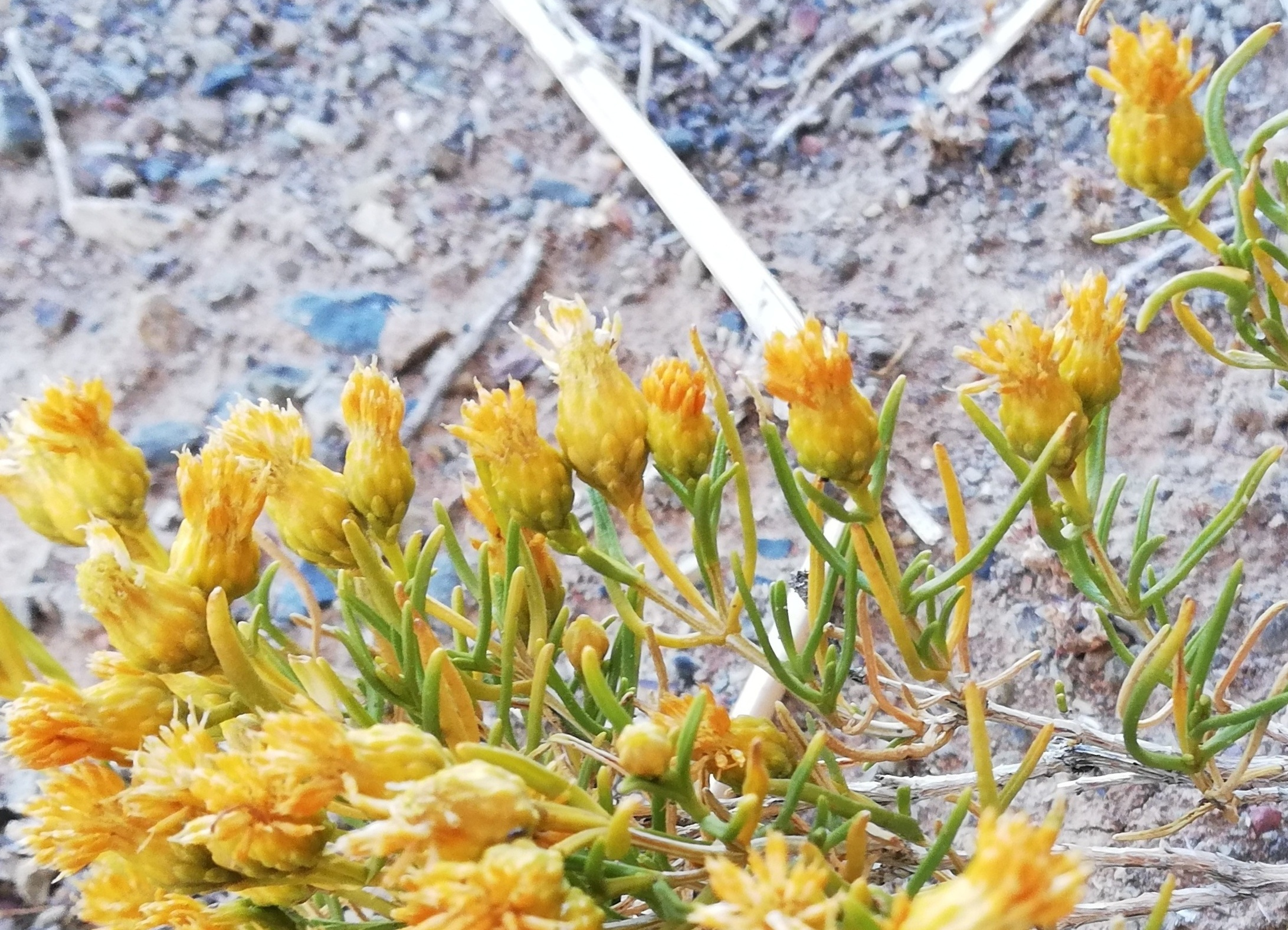
The tip of each Pteronia pallens stem produces only 1-3 rounded flower-heads.

A small shrub with pale woody stem. The leaves are slender, blunt-ended, channeled and green.

One to three rounded, discoid flower heads appear at the tips of the branches. This helps to distinguish it from the otherwise similar species Pteronia paniculata.

== Distribution ==
This species occurs in the western Little Karoo, the western Great Karoo and into the Northern Cape Province.

It usually grows on lower slopes on silt or sand that is often calciferous (often overlying calcrete).
