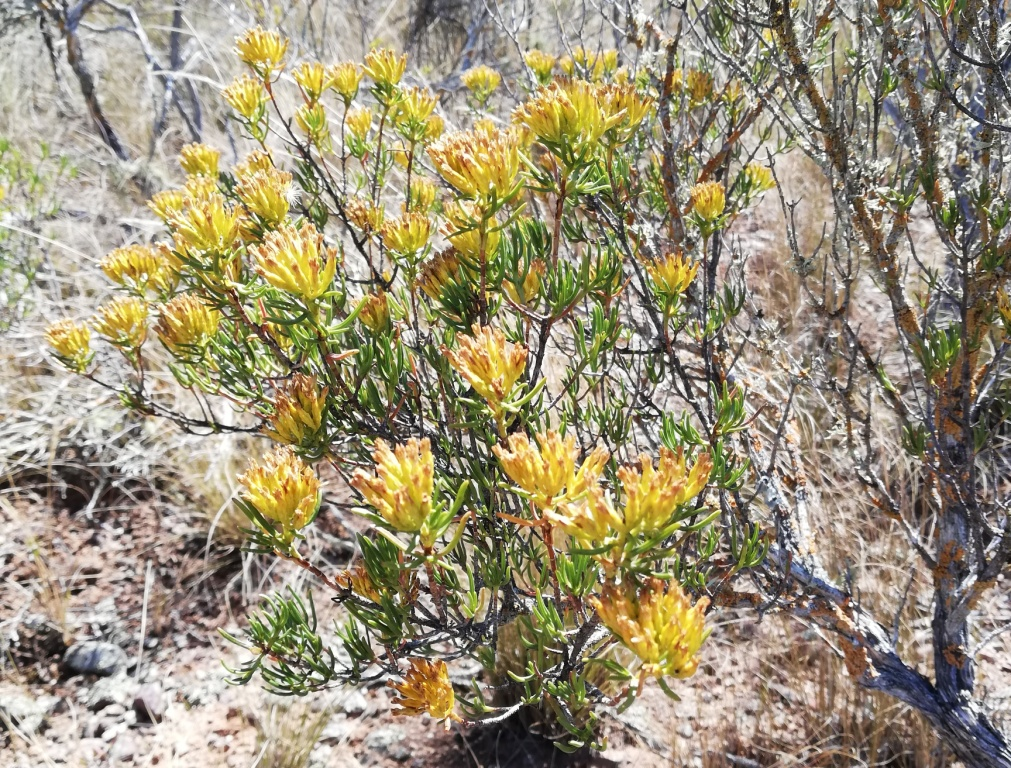

Scientific classification
- Kingdom: Plantae
- Clade: Embryophytes
- Clade: Tracheophytes
- Clade: Spermatophytes
- Clade: Angiosperms
- Clade: Eudicots
- Clade: Asterids
- Order: Asterales
- Family: Asteraceae
- Genus: Pteronia
- Species: P. paniculata

Binomial name
- Pteronia paniculata Thunb.

= Pteronia paniculata =

Species of plant

Pteronia paniculata ("Gombos" or "gum-bush") is a species of flowering plant in the family Asteraceae, indigenous to the Karoo regions of South Africa.

== Description ==
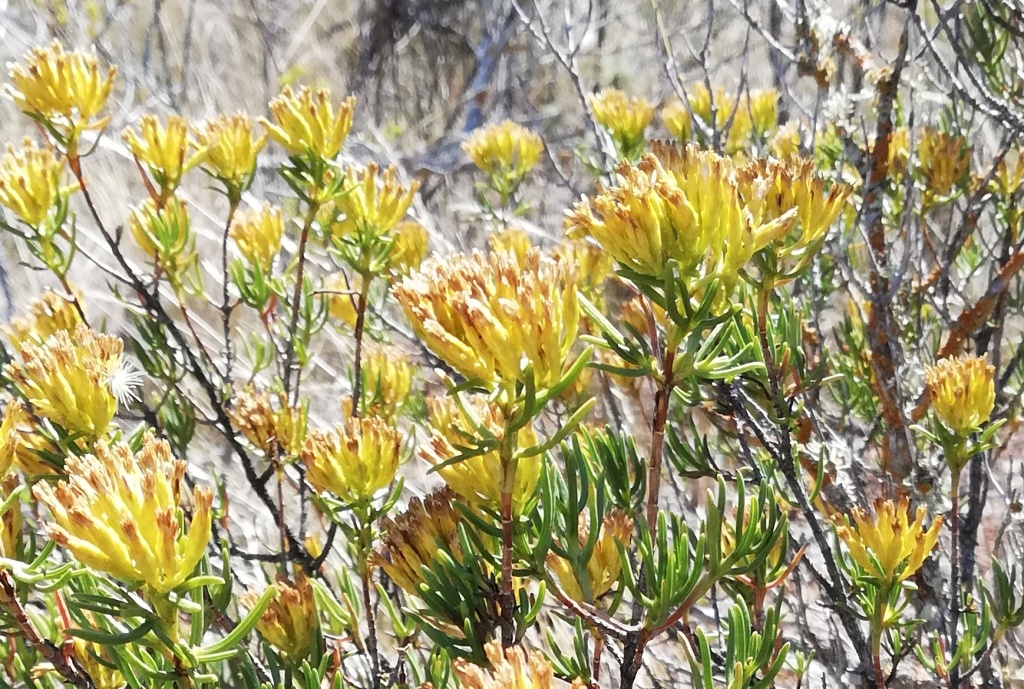
Detail of the clusters of flowers

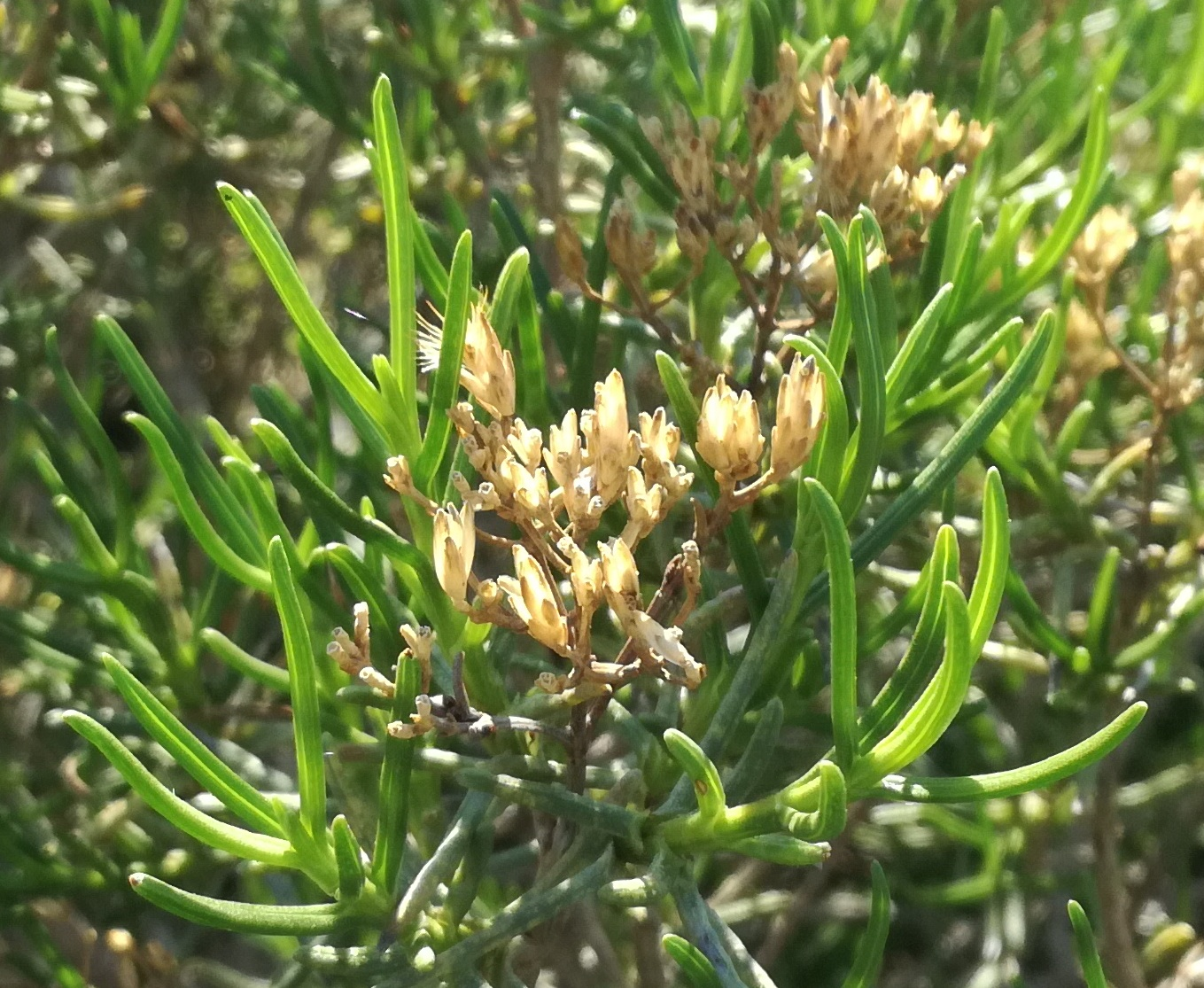
Detail of slender green leaves, and dried flower sheaths

This aromatic species has sticky leaves but, unlike some other Pteronia species, the flowers are not sticky. It has slender, furrowed, needle, incurved, green leaves, held in opposite pairs.

It forms clusters of flowers (several capitula) at the tips of its branches. This helps to distinguish it from the otherwise similar species Pteronia pallens.

== Distribution ==
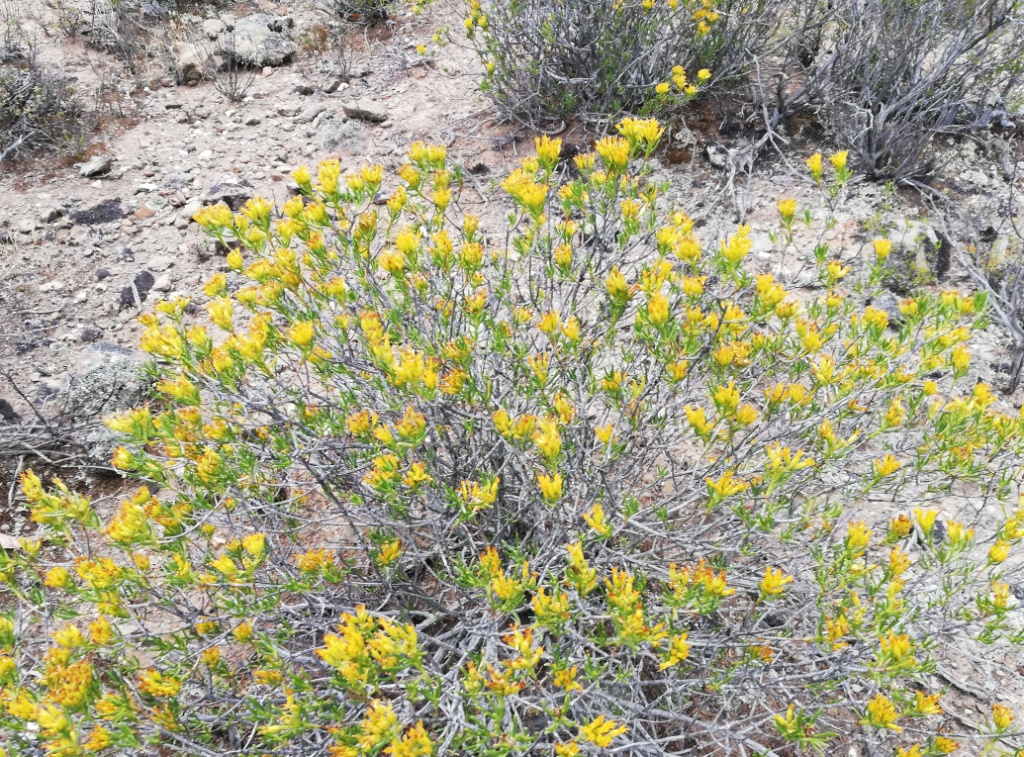
Adult bush in habitat

This species is widespread, occurring from Namibia to the Robertson Karoo in the south, as well as eastwards into the Eastern Cape.

Its natural habitat is dry, rocky apronveld and it is extremely common. Due to its being inedible for livestock, it achieves unnatural densities in areas that are overgrazed.

It often cooccurs with its close relatives, Pteronia pallens or Pteronia incana.
