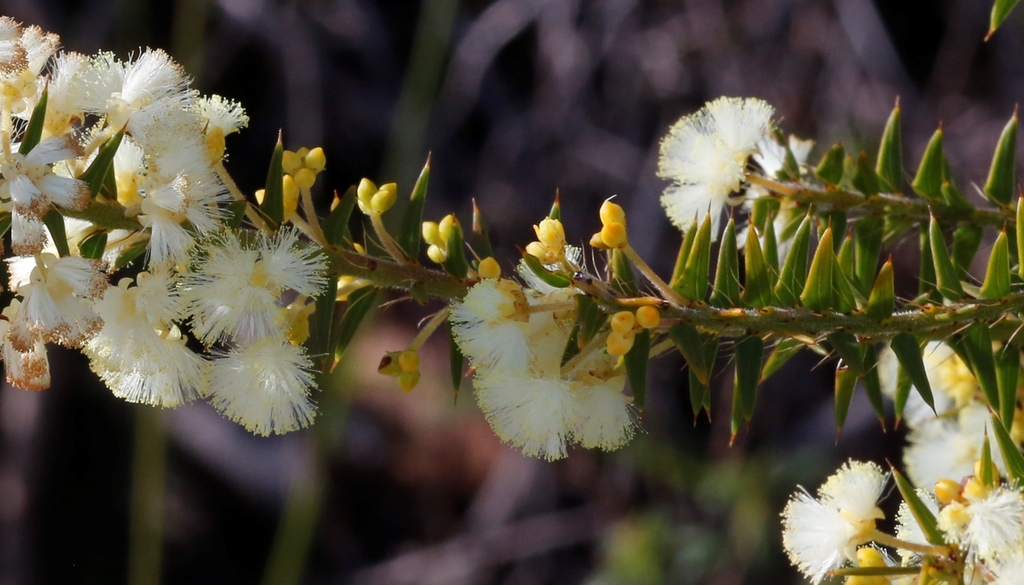

Conservation status
- Priority Three — Poorly Known Taxa (DEC)

Scientific classification
- Kingdom: Plantae
- Clade: Tracheophytes
- Clade: Angiosperms
- Clade: Eudicots
- Clade: Rosids
- Order: Fabales
- Family: Fabaceae
- Subfamily: Caesalpinioideae
- Clade: Mimosoid clade
- Genus: Acacia
- Species: A. horridula

Binomial name
- Acacia horridula Meisn.
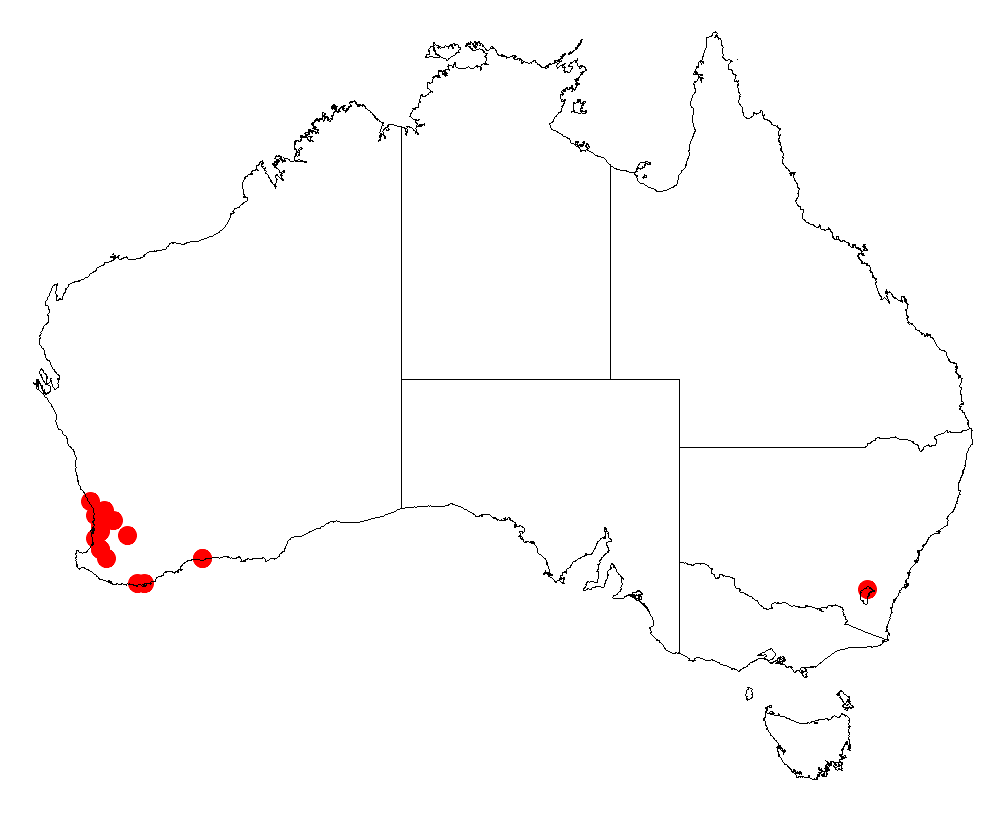
- Occurrence data from AVH

Synonyms
- Acacia horridula Meisn. var. horridula; Racosperma horridulum (Meisn.) Pedley

= Acacia horridula =

Species of legume

Acacia horridula is a species of flowering plant in the family Fabaceae and is endemic to the south-west of Western Australia. It is a harsh, slender, single-stemmed shrub with often crowded, sharply pointed, narrowly trowel-shaped phyllodes, spherical heads of pale yellow flowers and terete, curved pods narrowed at both ends.

== Description ==
Acacia horridula is a harsh, slender, single-stemmed shrub that typically grows to a height of up to 60 cm (24 in) and has red-brown to light brown branchlets. Its phyllodes are often crowded, narrowly trowel-shaped, sharply pointed, 6–8 mm (0.24–0.31 in) long and 1.5–2.5 mm (0.059–0.098 in) wide with a prominent angle on the lower edge. There are bristly, narrowly triangular stipules at the base of the phyllodes. The flowers are borne in a spherical head in axils on a peduncle 5–10 mm (0.20–0.39 in) long, each head with four pale yellow flowers. Flowering occurs from May to August and the pods are terete, narrowed at both ends, up to 75 mm (3.0 in) long and 3.5 mm (0.14 in) wide, red-brown and striated. The seeds are oblong, 4–5 mm (0.16–0.20 in) long with a conical aril on the end.

== Taxonomy ==
Acacia horridula was first formally described in 1844 by the Carl Meissner in Lehmann's Plantae Preissianae from specimens collected near the Canning River in 1839. The specific epithet (horridula) means 'prickly little'.

== Distribution and habitat ==
This species of wattle grows in sandy or gravelly soils over granite in rocky hillsides in Eucalyptus woodland in the Darling Range between the Helena Valley and the Serpentine River, and in the nearby coastal plain at Maddington, in the Jarrah Forest and Swan Coastal Plain bioregions of south-western Western Australia.

== See also ==
- List of Acacia species
