= Virgate (botany) =

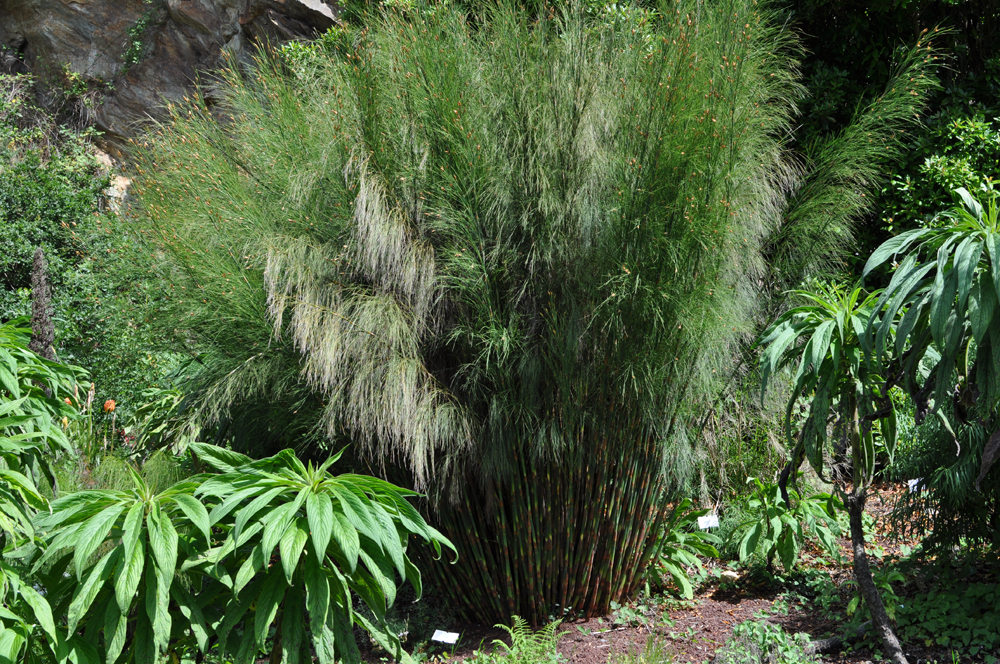
Cannomois virgata, a species of reed with virgate stems

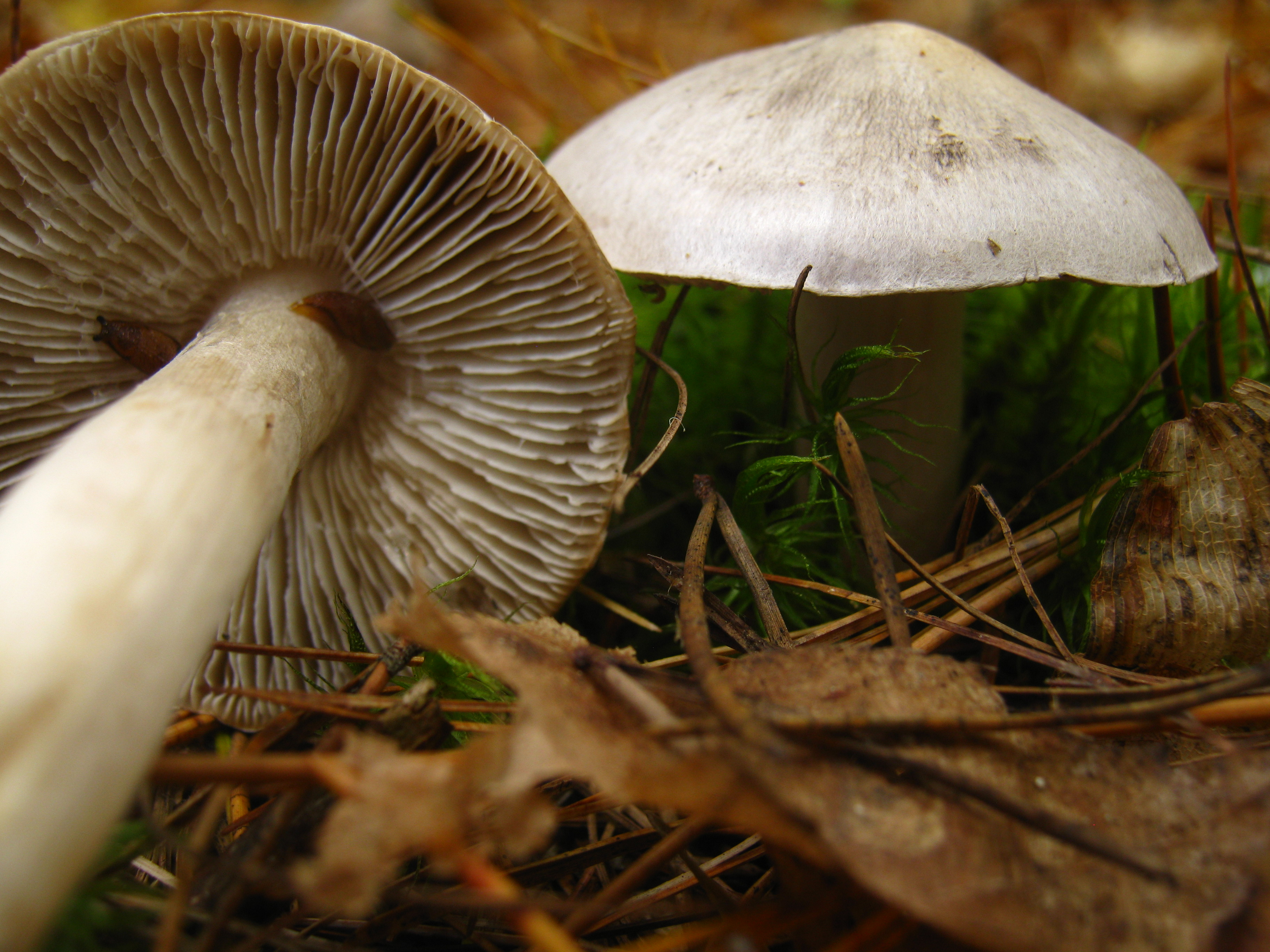
Tricholoma virgatum, an agaric with radiating gills and stripes

Virgate (from the Latin virgātus, "rod-like") is an adjective in botanical and mycological jargon.

== Botany ==
In botanical jargon, virgate most often refers to plants with wand-shaped erect branches or stems. For smaller plants or structures, the diminutive virgulate is used. The term occurs commonly in the biological names of plants, such as Vaccinium virgatum or Chloris virgata.

== Mycology ==
In mycological jargon, virgate and virgulate are used to describe mushroom caps (pilei) with pronounced radiating stripes or ribs, as in Tricholoma virgatum.
