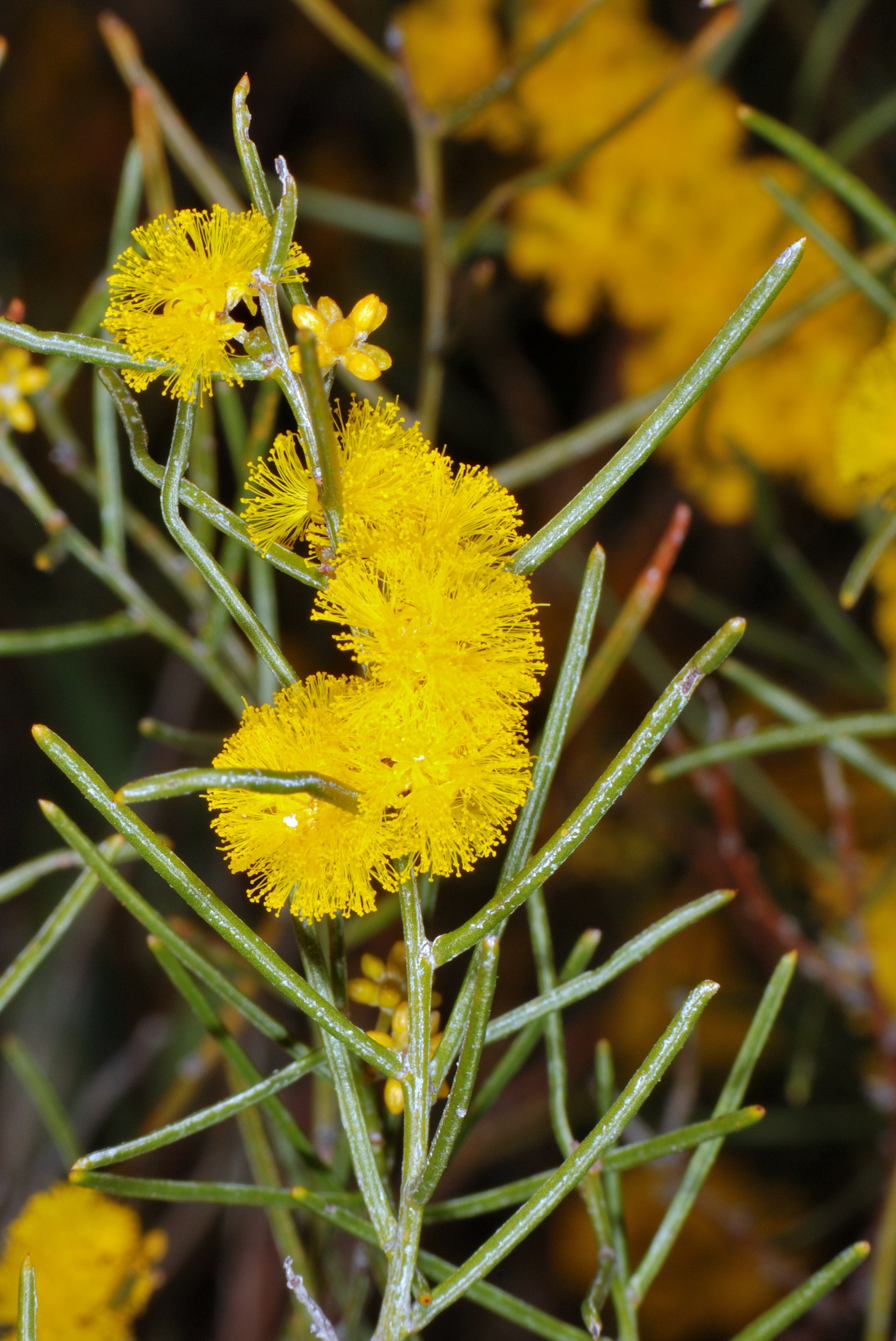

Conservation status
- Endangered (IUCN 3.1)

Scientific classification
- Kingdom: Plantae
- Clade: Tracheophytes
- Clade: Angiosperms
- Clade: Eudicots
- Clade: Rosids
- Order: Fabales
- Family: Fabaceae
- Subfamily: Caesalpinioideae
- Clade: Mimosoid clade
- Genus: Acacia
- Species: A. brachypoda

Binomial name
- Acacia brachypoda Maslin
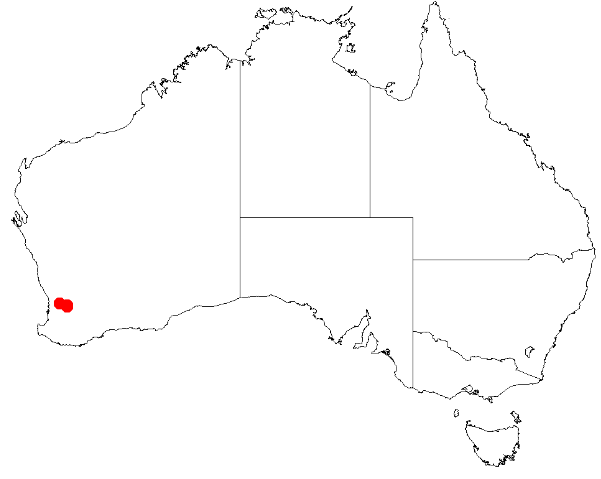
- Occurrence data from AVH

Synonyms
- Acacia aff. wilhelmiana (B.R.Maslin 4088); Racosperma brachypodum (Maslin) Pedley

= Acacia brachypoda =

Western wheatbelt wattle

Species of legume

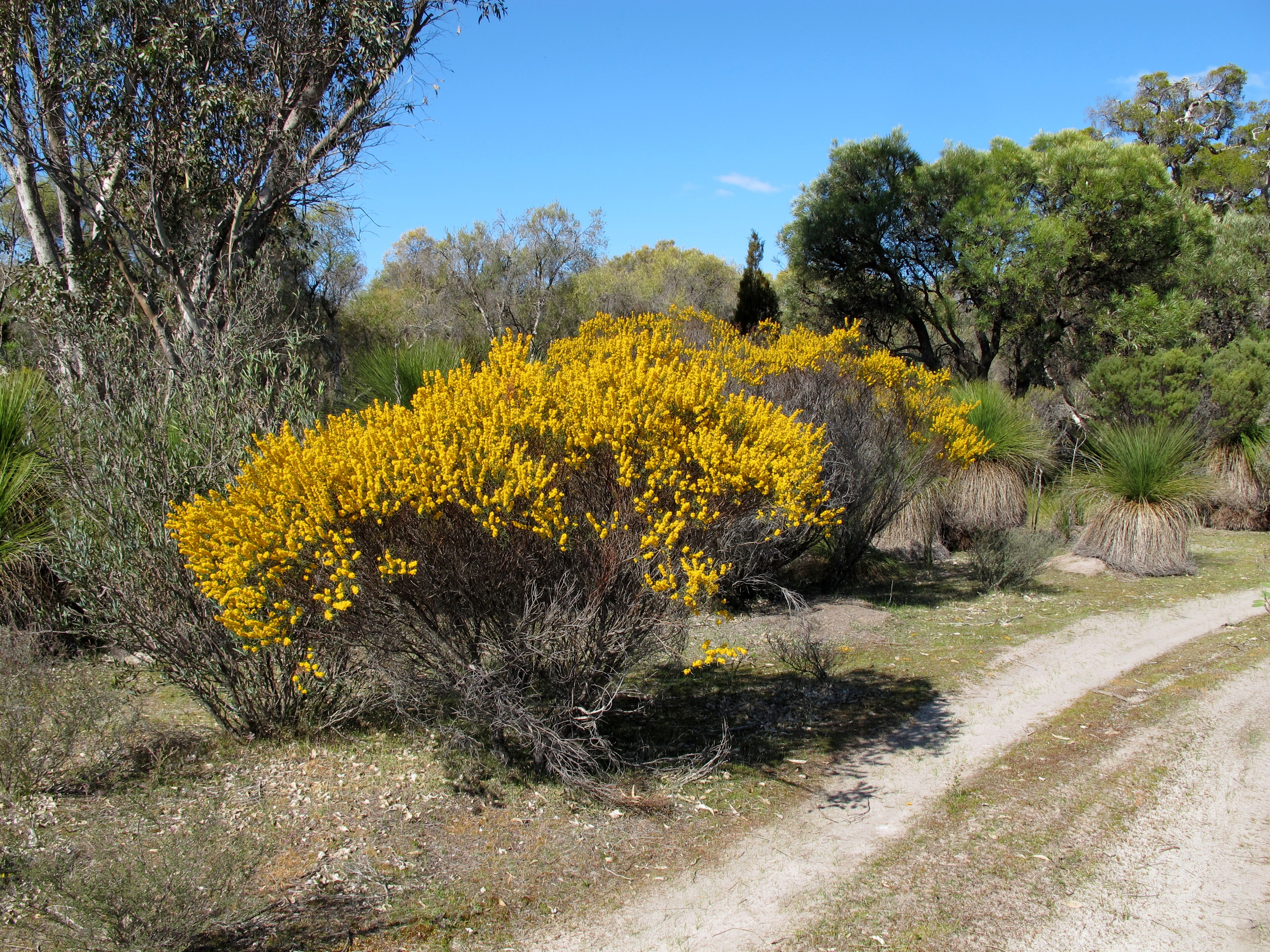
Habit

Acacia brachypoda, known colloquially as western wheatbelt wattle is an endangered species of flowering plant in the family Fabaceae and is endemic to the south-west of Western Australia. It is a dense, rounded, sticky shrub with broad, flat branchlets, straight to slightly curved, terete to flat and linear phyllodes, spherical heads of golden-yellow flowers, and curved, wavy or coiled, thinly leathery to crust-like pods.

== Description ==
Acacia brachypoda is a dense, rounded, slightly aromatic shrub that typically grows to 1–3 m (3 ft 3 in – 9 ft 10 in) high and 1–4 m (3 ft 3 in – 13 ft 1 in) wide with sticky new shoots flowers and pods broad, flat branchlets. Its phyllodes are spreading to erect, terete to flat and linear, 20–50 mm (0.79–1.97 in) long and 0.7–1.4 mm (0.028–0.055 in) wide with four obscure veins. The flowers are borne in two spherical heads in axils on peduncles 2–3 mm (0.079–0.118 in) long, each head with 8 or 9 golden-yellow flowers. Flowering occurs from about May, and the pods are curved, wavy, to irregularly coiled, 7–8 mm (0.28–0.31 in) wide, thinly leathery to crust-like, containing oblong seeds about 4 mm (0.16 in) long with a thick, yellow-brown aril.

== Taxonomy ==
Acacia brachypoda was first formally described in 1990 by the botanist Bruce Maslin in the journal Nuytsia from specimens he collected 13.5 km (8.4 mi) north of Brookton in 1976. The specific epithet (brachypoda) means 'short foot', referring to the short peduncles.

== Distribution and habitat ==
This species of wattle is endemic to a small area between Beverley, Brookton and York in the Avon Wheatbelt and Jarrah Forest bioregions of Western Australia where it is found in damp low-lying areas such as swamps in sandy-clay or loam soils. There are six populations of the wattle that are found in two main areas with an estimated 5000 recorded individuals remaining. One of the populations is found within the Wandoo National Park while the others are along roadsides and in railway reserve remnants. It is found in open woodland communities as part of a dense understorey. It is commonly associated with Eucalyptus wandoo or species of Allocasuarina, Callistemon phoeniceum, Hakea varia, species of Leptospermum and Melaleuca.

== Conservation status ==
Acacia brachypoda was list as endangered in 2008 under the Environment Protection and Biodiversity Conservation Act 1999 and as "Threatened Flora (Declared Rare Flora — Extant)" by the Government of Western Australia Department of Biodiversity, Conservation and Attractions, meaning that it is in danger of extinction. In 2012 the species was listed as endangered on the IUCN red list.

== See also ==
- List of Acacia species
