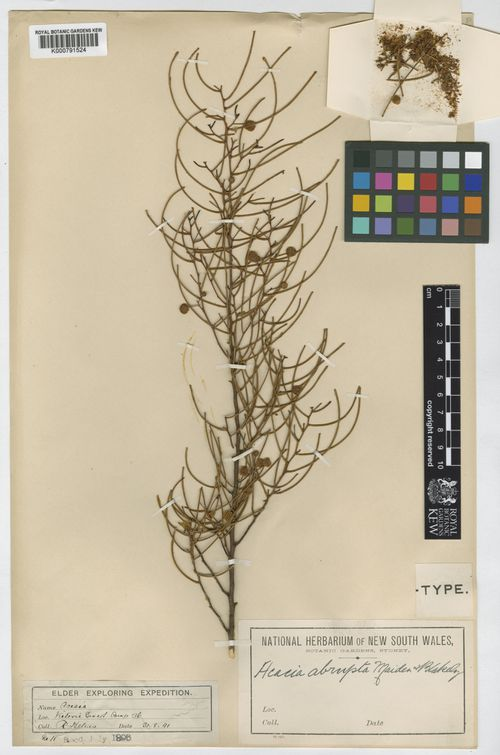
- Type specimen

Scientific classification
- Kingdom: Plantae
- Clade: Embryophytes
- Clade: Tracheophytes
- Clade: Spermatophytes
- Clade: Angiosperms
- Clade: Eudicots
- Clade: Rosids
- Order: Fabales
- Family: Fabaceae
- Subfamily: Caesalpinioideae
- Clade: Mimosoid clade
- Genus: Acacia
- Species: A. abrupta

Binomial name
- Acacia abrupta Maiden & Blakely
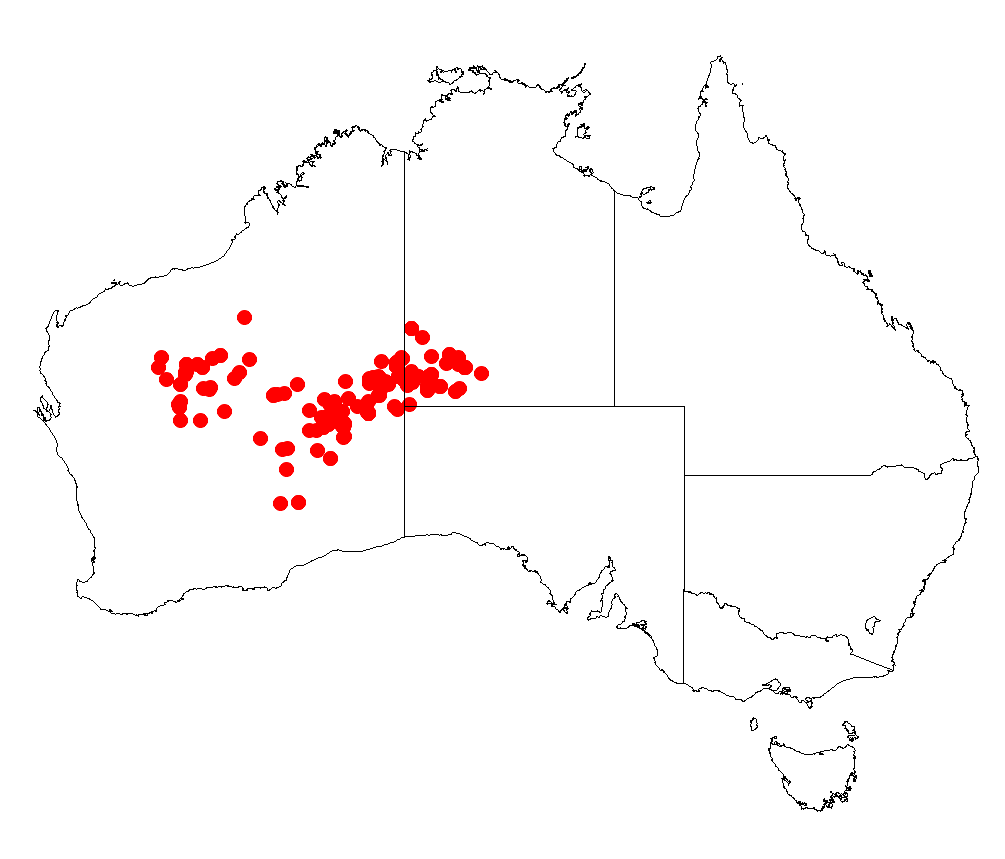
- Occurrence data from Australasian Virtual Herbarium

Synonyms
- Racosperma abruptum (Maiden & Blakely) Pedley

= Acacia abrupta =

Species of legume

Acacia abrupta is a species of flowering plant in the family Fabaceae and is endemic to arid parts of central and western Australia. It is a spreading, glabrous, resinous shrub with linear phyllodes that are round on cross-section, heads of golden-yellow flowers, and linear pods.

== Description ==
Acacia abrupta is a spreading, resinous, glabrous shrub that typically grows to a height of 0.6–3 m (2 ft 0 in – 9 ft 10 in) and has light grey bark. The phyllodes are dark green, upright to erect, linear and round in cross-section, usually 30–50 mm (1.2–2.0 in) long and 0.5–1 mm (0.020–0.039 in) wide. The flowers are borne in globe-shaped heads, sometimes the heads in a raceme on a peduncle 8–12 mm (0.31–0.47 in) long, the heads 2–4 mm (0.079–0.157 in) long with 25 to 35 golden-yellow flowers. Flowering occurs from July to September and the pods are linear, up to 50 mm (2.0 in) long and 2.5–3.0 mm (0.098–0.118 in) long with shallow constrictions between the seeds. The seeds are about 4 mm (0.16 in) long with a conspicuous aril.

== Taxonomy ==
Acacia abrupta was first formally described in 1927 by the botanists Joseph Maiden and William Blakely in the Journal of the Royal Society of Western Australia from specimens collected by Richard Helms on a sandplain in the Great Victoria Desert, during the Elder Scientific Exploring Expedition in 1891. The specific epithet (abrupta) means "broken off", referring to the abrupt tip of the phyllodes.

This species is closely related to A. ascendens, and can be mistaken for A. helmsiana which shares the same habitat.

== Distribution ==
This species is native to central Western Australia and the south-west of the Northern Territory where it is found on sand dunes, sandplains and gravelly hillslopes growing in red sandy lateritic based soils. It occurs in the Central Ranges, Gascoyne, Gibson Desert, Great Sandy Desert, Great Victoria Desert, Little Sandy Desert, Murchison and MacDonnell Ranges bioregions of Western Australia and the Northern Territory.

== See also ==
- List of Acacia species
