= Graceful wattle =

Graceful wattle is a common name for several plants and may refer to:

- Acacia decora, native to eastern Australia
- Acacia gracilifolia
