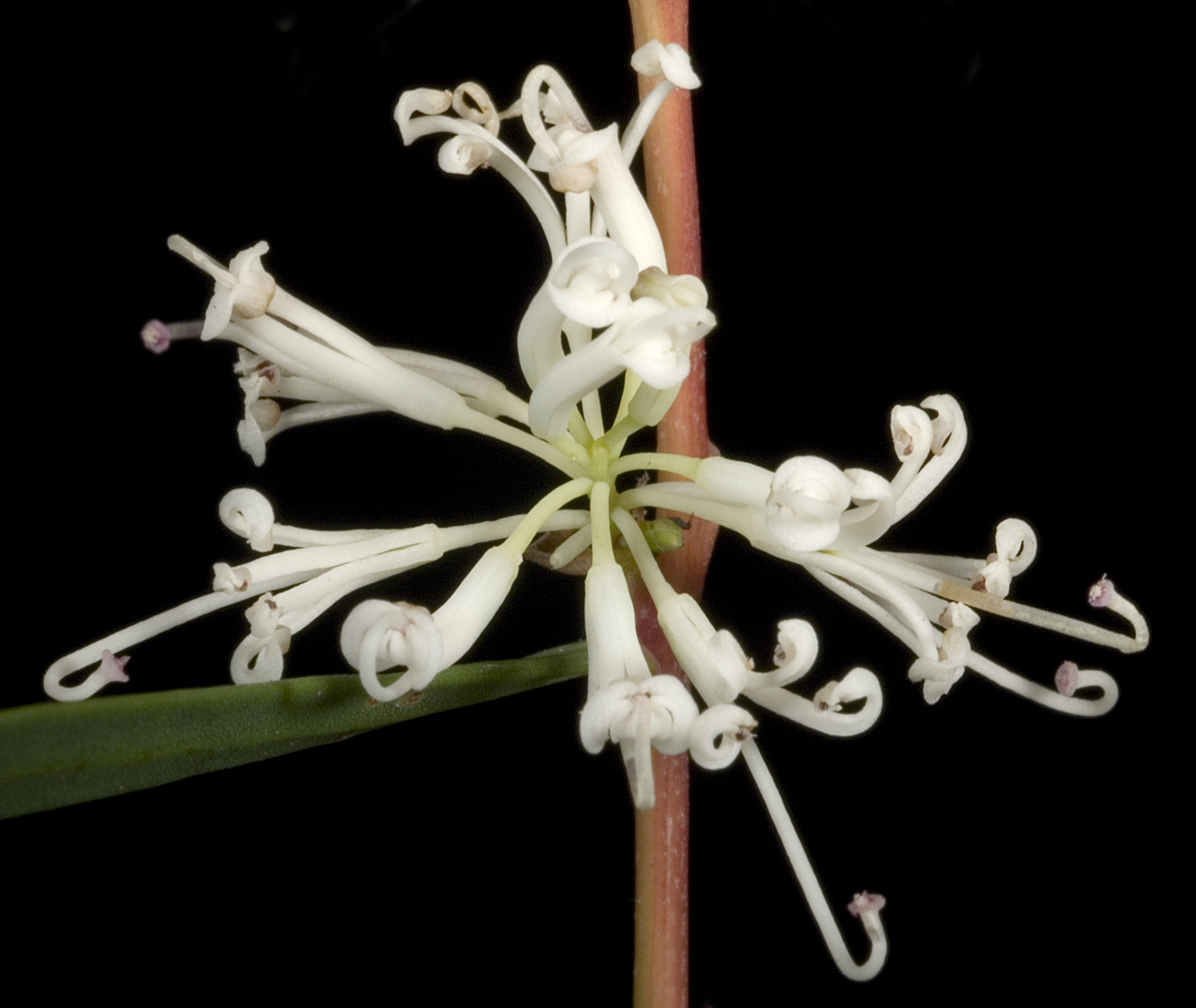

Scientific classification
- Kingdom: Plantae
- Clade: Tracheophytes
- Clade: Angiosperms
- Clade: Eudicots
- Order: Proteales
- Family: Proteaceae
- Genus: Hakea
- Species: H. linearis

Binomial name
- Hakea linearis R.Br.
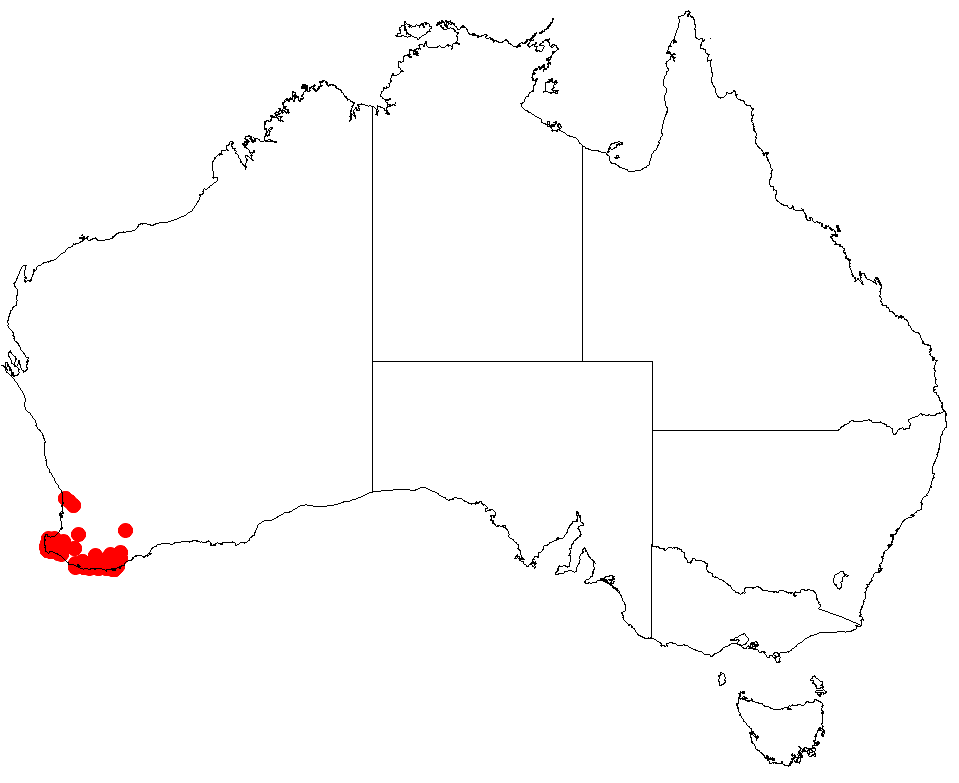
- Occurrence data from AVH

= Hakea linearis =

Species of plant endemic to Western Australia

Hakea linearis is a shrub or tree in the family Proteaceae and is endemic to Western Australia. It has smooth branches, mostly linear leaves and white flowers.

== Description ==
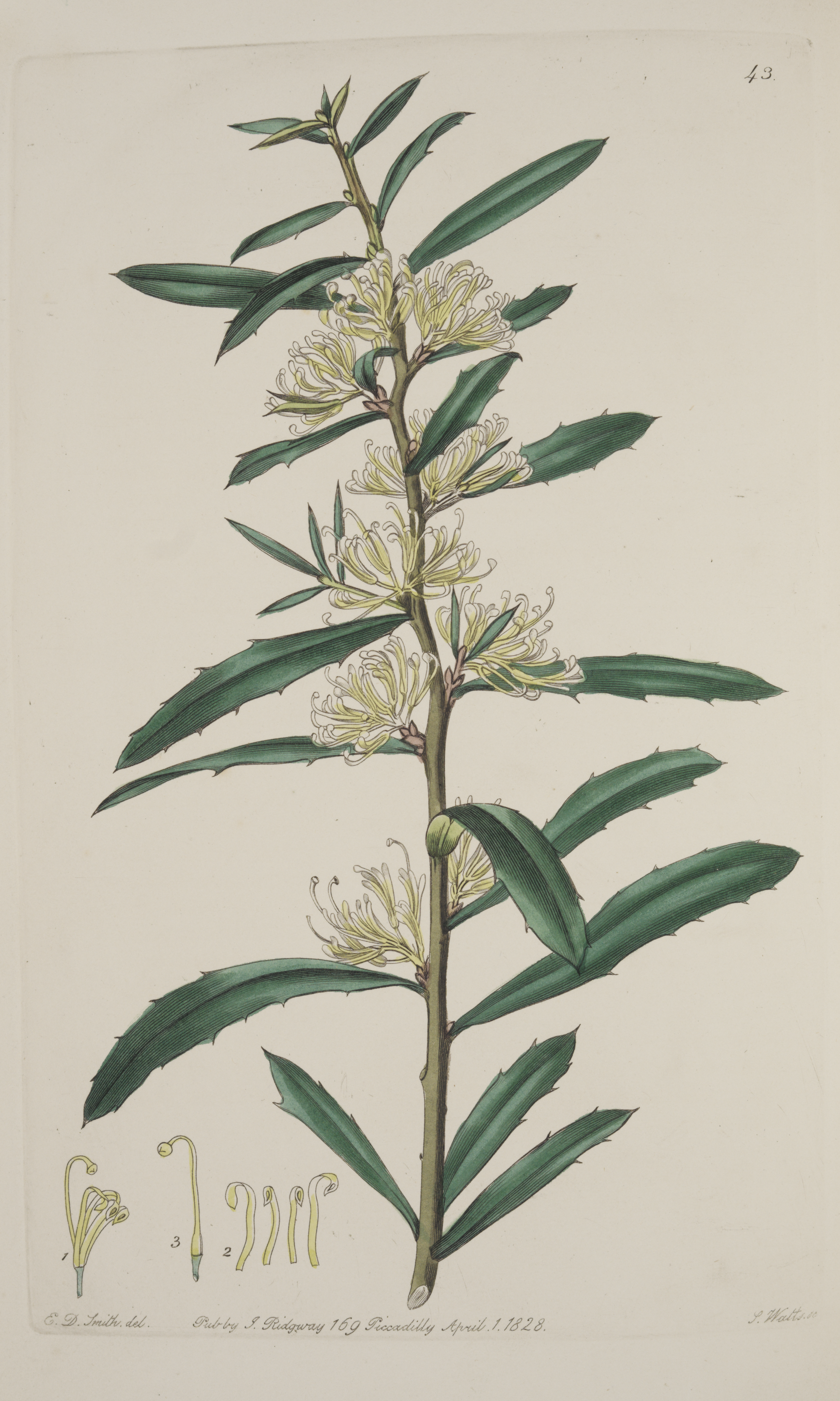
Hakea linearis illustration from Robert Sweet's Flora Australasica (1828)

The shrub or tree typically grows to a height of 0.6 to 4 metres (2 to 13 ft). The branches are glabrous as are the thin evergreen leaves which have a linear to narrowly elliptic shape and are 2 to 8 centimetres (0.8 to 3.1 in) in length with a width of 2 to 7 millimetres (0.079 to 0.276 in). It blooms from January to May or October to December and produces cream-white flowers. Each simple inflorescence contain 16 to 20 flowers with a white glabrous perianth that is 3 to 5 mm (0.118 to 0.197 in) in length. The rugose to black-pusticulate fruits have an obliquely obovate shape with a curved apex. Each fruit is 1.5 to 2.5 cm (0.59 to 0.98 in) in length with a width of 0.7 to 1 mm (0.028 to 0.039 in) and have 2 to 4 mm (0.079 to 0.157 in) long horns. The seeds within have an obliquely obovate shape and a wing down one side.

== Taxonomy and naming ==
The species was first formally described by the botanist Robert Brown in 1810 and the description was published in Transactions of the Linnean Society of London. The specific epithet is taken from the Latin word linearis meaning "linear", which refers to the shape of the leaves. It can be confused with Hakea varia and related species.

== Distribution and habitat ==
It is endemic to an area along the coast in the South West and Great Southern regions of Western Australia between Busselton in the west, Wagin to the north and Albany to the south. It is often found among granite outcrops and seasonally damp areas like swamps growing in sandy or sandy-clay soils and is usually part of sandy heathland or Eucalyptus woodland communitities.
