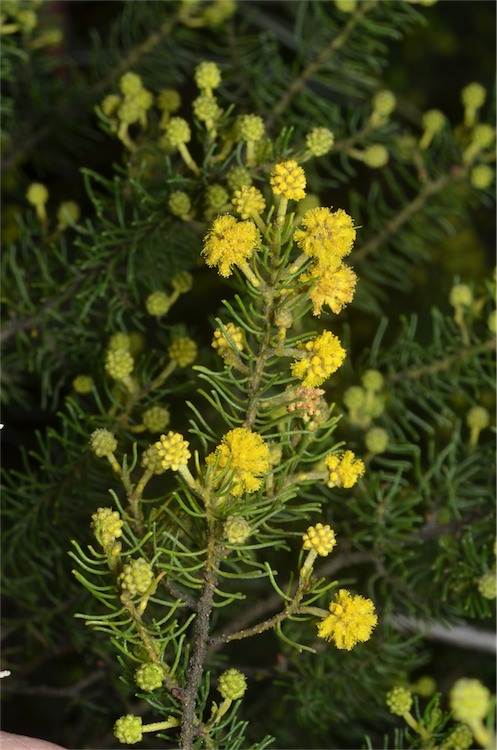
- In the Australian National Botanic Gardens

Conservation status
- Endangered (EPBC Act)

Scientific classification
- Kingdom: Plantae
- Clade: Tracheophytes
- Clade: Angiosperms
- Clade: Eudicots
- Clade: Rosids
- Order: Fabales
- Family: Fabaceae
- Subfamily: Caesalpinioideae
- Clade: Mimosoid clade
- Genus: Acacia
- Species: A. leptalea

Binomial name
- Acacia leptalea Maslin

Synonyms
- Acacia aff. vassalii (K.R.Newbey 3399); Racosperma leptaleum (Maslin) Pedley

= Acacia leptalea =

Chinocup wattle

Species of legume

Acacia leptalea, commonly known as Chinocup wattle, is a species of flowering plant in the family Fabaceae and is endemic to a small area in the south-west of Western Australia. It is a dense, rounded shrub with more or less straight, terete phyllodes, spherical heads of golden yellow flowers and hairy, slightly sticky pods.

== Description ==
Acacia leptalea is a dense, rounded shrub that typically grows to a height of 0.5–2.0 m (1.6–6.6 ft) and has hairy branchlets and raised leaf bases. It has sometimes crowded, more or less straight, terete or slightly compressed phyllodes 5–8 mm (0.20–0.31 in) long and 0.3–0.4 mm (0.012–0.016 in) wide with a narrowed, off-centred point on the tip. The phyllodes have no discernible veins and no glands. The flowers are borne in a spherical head in axils on a hairy, pale yellow peduncle 3–4 mm (0.12–0.16 in) long with 25 golden yellow flowers. Flowering occurs in July, and the pods are hairy, slightly sticky, up to 25 mm (0.98 in) long, 4–5 mm (0.16–0.20 in) wide and slightly sticky, the valves curved to s-shaped after releasing the seeds. The seeds are egg-shaped, 3.0–3.5 mm (0.12–0.14 in) long, and shiny brown with a slightly club-shaped aril near the end.

== Taxonomy ==
Acacia leptalea was first formally described in 1999 by Bruce Maslin in the journal Nuytsia from specimens collected near Nyabing in 1989. The specific epithet (leptalea) means 'thin or delicate', referring to the phyllodes.

== Distribution and habitat ==
This species of wattle is only known from near Nyabing, where it grows in sand or sandy loam on an undulating plain, in open mallee woodland with a dense understorey.

== Conservation status ==
Acacia leptalea is listed as 'endangered' under the Australian Government Environment Protection and Biodiversity Conservation Act 1999 and as 'Threatened Flora (Declared Rare Flora — Extant)' by the Western Australian Government Department of Biodiversity, Conservation and Attractions.

== See also ==
- List of Acacia species
