= Acacia viscifolia =

Scientific classification
- Kingdom: Plantae
- Clade: Tracheophytes
- Clade: Angiosperms
- Clade: Eudicots
- Clade: Rosids
- Order: Fabales
- Family: Fabaceae
- Subfamily: Caesalpinioideae
- Clade: Mimosoid clade
- Genus: Acacia
- Species: A. viscifolia

Binomial name
- Acacia viscifolia Maiden & Blakely
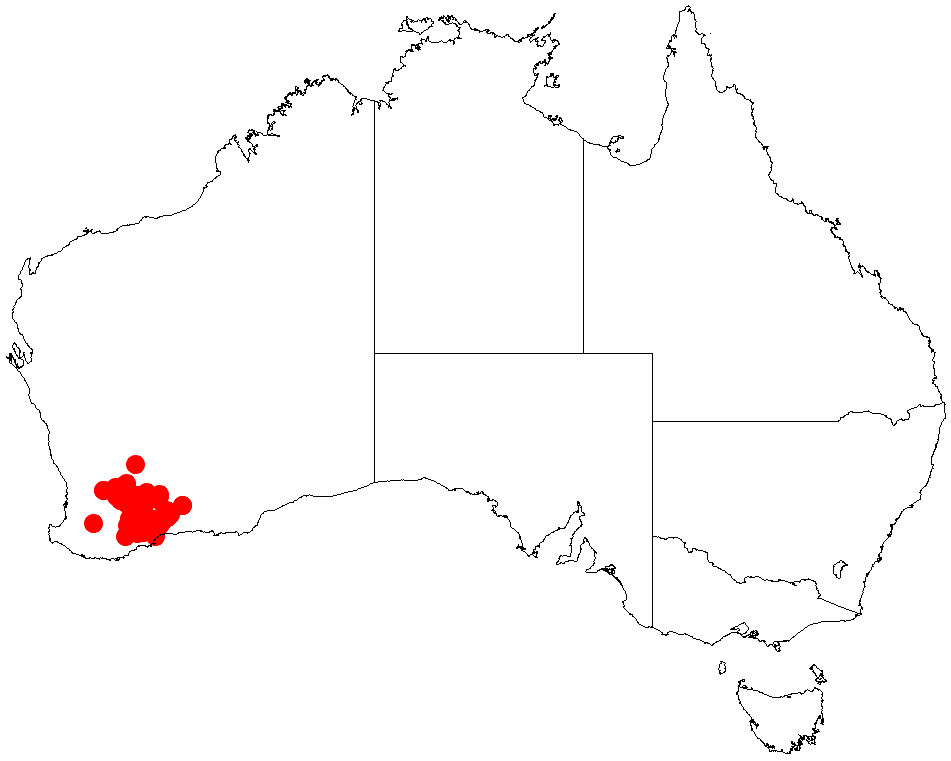
- Occurrence data from AVH

Species of legume

Acacia viscifolia is a shrub of the genus Acacia and the subgenus Plurinerves that is endemic to an area of south western Australia.

== Description ==
The shrub typically grows to a height of 0.3 to 1 metre (1 to 3 ft) and has a resinous and dwarf habit with angular cylindrical and tapering branchlets. Like most species of Acacia it has phyllodes rather than true leaves. The finely striated, threadlike, filiform phyllodes are 1 to 4 cm (0.39 to 1.57 in) in length and have a diameter of around 0.5 mm (0.020 in) and are often incurved. It blooms from June to August and produces yellow flowers. It produces inflorescences that appear in groups of three to four on racemes and are composed of spherical flower-heads composed of 20 to 25 yellow flowers.

== Taxonomy ==
The species was first formally described by the botanists Joseph Maiden and William Blakely in 1927 as a part of the work Descriptions of fifty new species and six varieties of western and northern Australian Acacias, and notes on four other species published in the work Journal of the Royal Society of Western Australia. It was reclassified as Racosperma viscifolium in 2003 by Leslie Pedley then returned to genus Acacia in 2006.

== Distribution ==
It is native to an area in the Wheatbelt and Great Southern regions of Western Australia where it is often found in low-lying areas usually around ricers, creek and swamps growing in sandy, clay or loamy soils.

== See also ==
- List of Acacia species
