= Acacia cowaniana =

Cowan's wattle

Conservation status
- Priority Two — Poorly Known Taxa (DEC)

Scientific classification
- Kingdom: Plantae
- Clade: Tracheophytes
- Clade: Angiosperms
- Clade: Eudicots
- Clade: Rosids
- Order: Fabales
- Family: Fabaceae
- Subfamily: Caesalpinioideae
- Clade: Mimosoid clade
- Genus: Acacia
- Species: A. cowaniana

Binomial name
- Acacia cowaniana Maslin
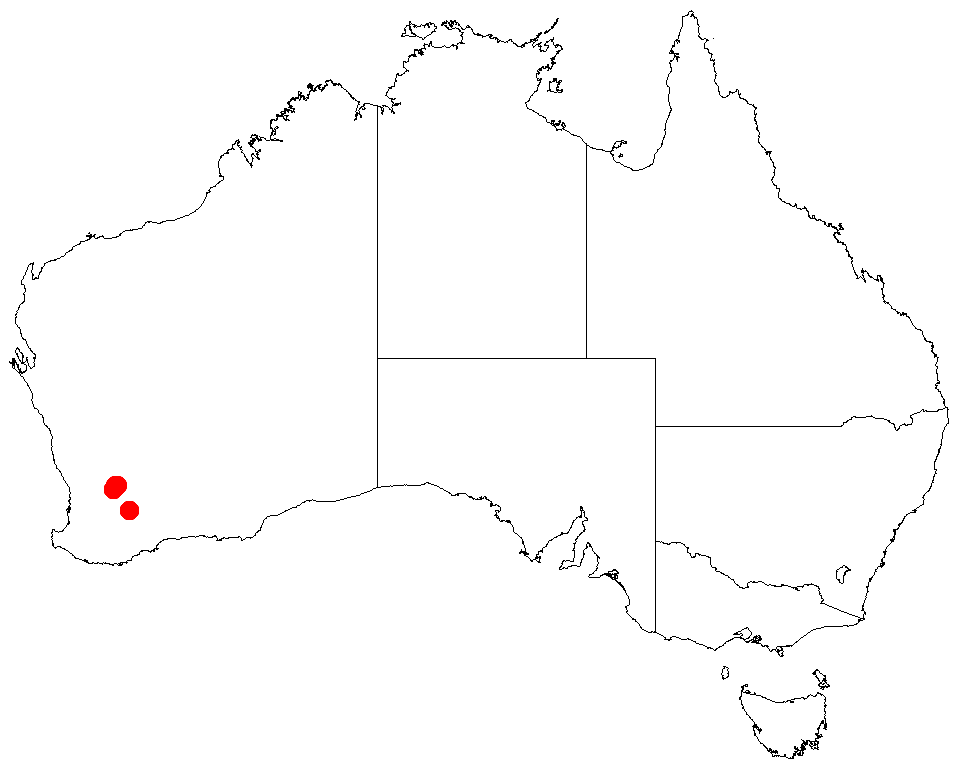
- Occurrence data from AVH

Synonyms
- Acacia aff. wilhelmiana [P9] (B.R.Maslin 6015); Racosperma cowanianum (Maslin) Pedley

Species of legume

Acacia cowaniana, commonly known as Cowan's wattle, is a species of flowering plant in the family Fabaceae and is endemic to the south-west of Western Australia. It is a shrub or tree with narrowly linear, curved phyllodes with a more or less hooked end, spherical heads of cream-coloured to pale lemon-yellow flowers and linear, firmly leathery pods.

== Description ==
Acacia cowaniana is a shrub or tree that typically grows to a height of up to 5 m (16 ft) and has glabrous branchlets, or sometimes sparsely covered with soft, white or golden hairs, and fibrous bark. Its phyllodes are narrowly linear, 30–50 mm (1.2–2.0 in) long and 1–2.5 mm (0.039–0.098 in) wide with a more or less hooked end and 3 to 7 obscure veins. The flowers are borne in spherical heads in racemes on peduncles 5–7 mm (0.20–0.28 in) long, each head with about 20 cream-coloured to pale lemon-yellow flowers. Flowering occurs from April to June and the pods are linear, firmly leathery, up to 80 mm (3.1 in) long and 4.5–6 mm (0.18–0.24 in) wide, the seeds oblong, about 3.5 mm (0.14 in) long with a club-shaped aril.

== Taxonomy ==
Acacia cowaniana was first formally described in 1990 by the botanist Bruce Maslin in the journal Nuytsia from specimens he collected on the eastern slopes of Mount Caroline, 21 km (13 mi) south-south-west of Kellerberrin in 1986. The specific epithet (cowaniana) honours Richard Sumner Cowan.

== Distribution and habitat ==
Cowan's wattle is restricted to a few granite outcrops near Kellerberrin and Kulin in the Avon Wheatbelt and Mallee bioregions of south-western Western Australia.

== Conservation status ==
Acacia cowaniana is listed as "Priority Two" by the Government of Western Australia Department of Biodiversity, Conservation and Attractions, meaning that it is poorly known and from one or a few locations.

== See also ==
- List of Acacia species
