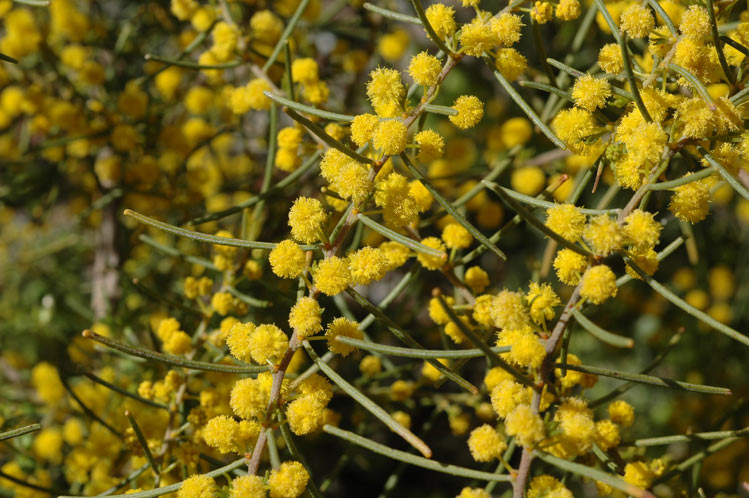

Scientific classification
- Kingdom: Plantae
- Clade: Tracheophytes
- Clade: Angiosperms
- Clade: Eudicots
- Clade: Rosids
- Order: Fabales
- Family: Fabaceae
- Subfamily: Caesalpinioideae
- Clade: Mimosoid clade
- Genus: Acacia
- Species: A. menzelii

Binomial name
- Acacia menzelii J.M.Black
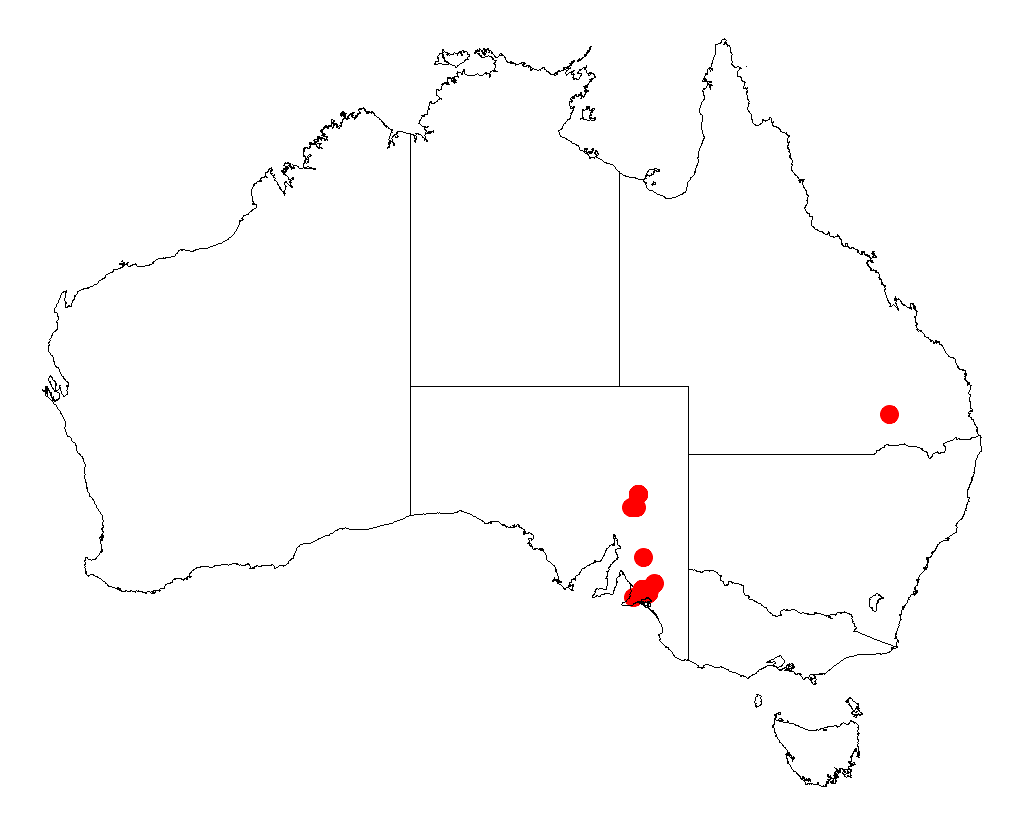
- Occurrence data from AVH

Synonyms
- Racosperma menzelii (J.M.Black) Pedley

= Acacia menzelii =

Species of plant

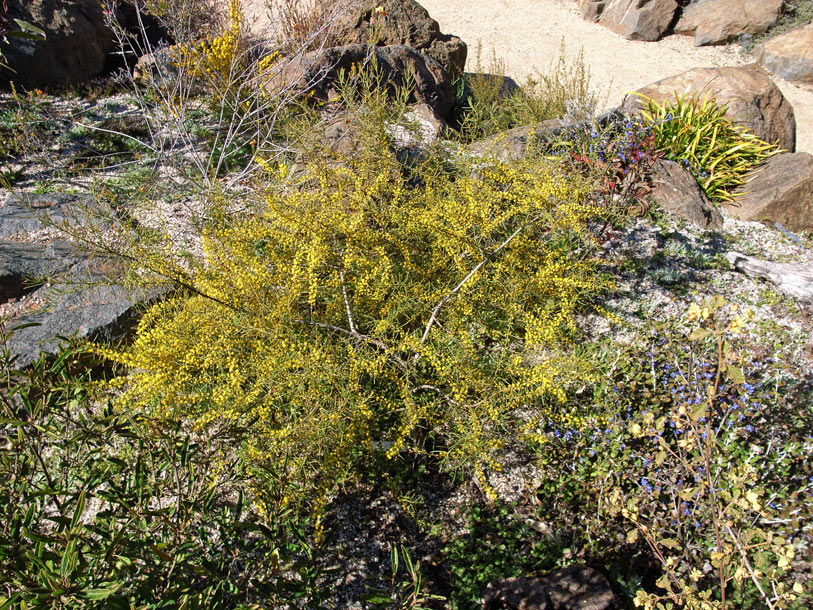
Habit in the Australian National Botanic Gardens

Acacia menzelii, commonly known as Menzel's wattle, is a species of flowering plant in the family Fabaceae and is endemic to South Australia. It is a compact, rounded, spreading, resinous, sticky shrub with hairy branchlets, terete to flat, linear phyllodes, spherical heads of golden yellow flowers, and linear, thinly leathery to papery pods, scarcely constricted between the seeds.

== Description ==
Acacia menzelii is a compact, rounded, spreading, resinous, sticky shrub that typically grows to a height of up to 2 m (6 ft 7 in) and has branchlets that are sparsely covered with soft hairs pressed against the surface. It has terete to flat and linear, straight to curved, glabrous phyllodes 15–40 mm (0.59–1.57 in) long, 0.51 mm (0.020 in) wide with two brownish veins on each face when flat. The flowers are borne in one or two spherical heads in axils, on glabrous peduncles 3–8 mm (0.12–0.31 in) long, each head with 20 to 27 golden yellow flowers. Flowering occurs from July to October, and the pods are linear, more or less straight and biconvex, up to 50 mm (2.0 in) long, 2–3 mm (0.079–0.118 in) wide, thinly leathery to papery and glabrous. The seeds are oblong, about 4 mm (0.16 in) long with a fleshy aril.

== Taxonomy ==
Acacia menzelii was first formally described in 1917 by John McConnell Black in Transactions and Proceedings of the Royal Society of South Australia from specimens collected by Oscar Ernest Menzel at Monarto in 1897. The specific epithet (menzelii) honours the collector of the type specimens.

This species is sometimes known as Tallebung wattle, but Tallebung was a mining village in New South Wales. The record of A. menzelii in New South Wales is "based on the misidentification of a specimen which represents a taxon of uncertain status but which is perhaps a hybrid involving A. montana.

== Distribution and habitat ==
Menzel's wattle has a discontinuous distribution from Mount Hack and the North Flinders Ranges to Murray Bridge in South Australia. It grows in gorges or on rocky hillsides in brown to grey calcareous loamy soils in scrubby Eucalyptus woodland.

== Conservation status ==
Acacia menzelii is listed as 'Vulnerable' under the Australian Government Environment Protection and Biodiversity Conservation Act 1999 and the South Australian Government National Parks and Wildlife Act 1972.

== See also ==
- List of Acacia species
