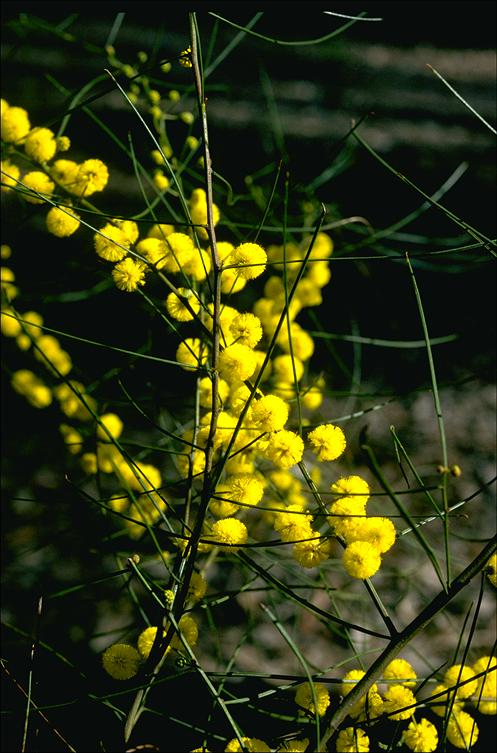
- In the Australian National Botanic Gardens

Scientific classification
- Kingdom: Plantae
- Clade: Embryophytes
- Clade: Tracheophytes
- Clade: Spermatophytes
- Clade: Angiosperms
- Clade: Eudicots
- Clade: Rosids
- Order: Fabales
- Family: Fabaceae
- Subfamily: Caesalpinioideae
- Clade: Mimosoid clade
- Genus: Acacia
- Species: A. gracilifolia

Binomial name
- Acacia gracilifolia Maiden & Blakely
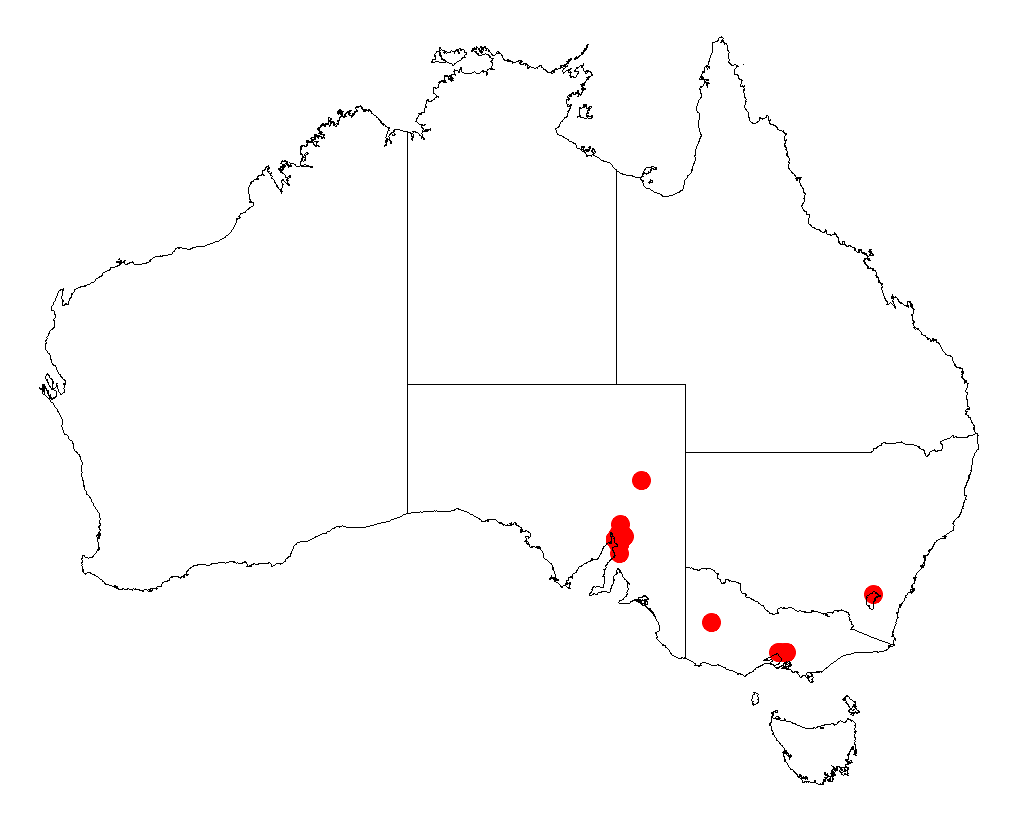
- Occurrence data from AVH

Synonyms
- Racosperma gracilifolium (Maiden & Blakely) Pedley

= Acacia gracilifolia =

Graceful wattle

Species of plant

Acacia gracilifolia, commonly known as graceful wattle, is a species of flowering plant in the family Fabaceae and is endemic to South Australia. It is a resinous, slightly sticky shrub with thread-like phyllodes, spherical heads of light golden yellow flowers and linear, papery pods raised over the seeds.

== Description ==
Acacia gracilifolia is a resinous, slightly sticky shrub that typically grows to a height of 1 to 2 metres (3.3 to 6.6 ft) and has slender, glabrous branchlets with yellow ribs. Its phyllodes are thread-like, straight or slightly curved, 50–100 mm (2.0–3.9 in) long and about 1 mm (0.039 in) wide with two veins on each side, separated by a groove, and up to four glands, the lowest 10–15 mm (0.39–0.59 in) above the pulvinus. The flowers are borne in usually two spherical to oblong heads in axils on a peduncle 5–8 mm (0.20–0.31 in) long, each head with 23 to 26 light golden yellow flowers. Flowering occurs between August and November, and the pods are linear, firmly papery, up to 70 mm (2.8 in) long and about 2 mm (0.079 in) wide. The seeds are oblong, 3.5–4.0 mm (0.14–0.16 in) long with a small aril.

== Taxonomy ==
Acacia gracilifolia was first formally described in 1927 by the botanists Joseph Maiden and William Blakely in the Journal and Proceedings of the Royal Society of New South Wales from specimens collected in the Flinders Range by Walter Gill in 1900. The specific epithet (gracilifolia) is means 'thin or slender leaves' referring to the phyllodes.

== Distribution and habitat ==
Graceful wattle occurs in South Australia between Wilmington and Telowie Gorge Conservation Park where it grows in gorges and on rocky hillsides, often in shallow loam in woodland scrub.

== See also ==
- List of Acacia species
