= Acacia ascendens =

Conservation status
- Priority Two — Poorly Known Taxa (DEC)

Scientific classification
- Kingdom: Plantae
- Clade: Tracheophytes
- Clade: Angiosperms
- Clade: Eudicots
- Clade: Rosids
- Order: Fabales
- Family: Fabaceae
- Subfamily: Caesalpinioideae
- Clade: Mimosoid clade
- Genus: Acacia
- Species: A. ascendens

Binomial name
- Acacia ascendens Maslin
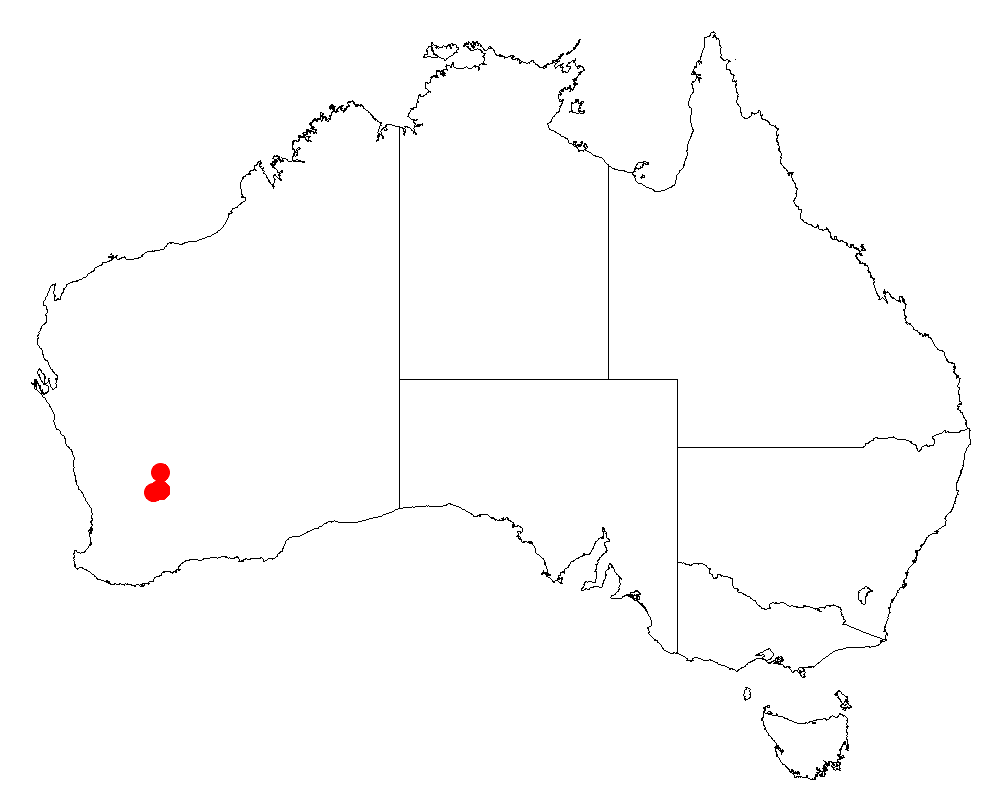
- Occurrence data from AVH

Synonyms
- Racosperma ascendens (Maslin) Pedley

Species of legume

Acacia ascendens is a species of flowering plant in the family Fabaceae and is endemic to inland areas of Western Australia. It is an erect shrub with inclined to erect phyllodes that are round in cross-section, spherical heads of golden yellow flowers, and narrowly oblong pods up to 70 mm (2.8 in) long.

== Description ==
Acacia ascendens is an erect shrub that typically grows to a height of 1.5–3 m (4 ft 11 in – 9 ft 10 in) and has smooth, mid-grey bark. New growth is resinous and slightly sticky. The phyllodes are inclined or erect, cylindrical in cross section, 20–40 mm (0.79–1.57 in) long about 1 mm (0.039 in) wide, with four veins and often with a hooked end. The flowers are arranged in one or two racemes in axils or on the ends of branches with one or two heads on a peduncle 5–14 mm (0.20–0.55 in) long. Each head is spherical with 20 to 25 resinous, golden yellow flowers. Flowering occurs from June to September and the fruit is a narrowly oblong pod, up to 70 mm (2.8 in) long and about 5 mm (0.20 in) wide containing oblong to elliptic seeds with a club-shaped aril.

== Taxonomy ==
Acacia ascendens was first formally described in 1990 by the botanist Bruce Maslin in the journal Nuytsia from specimens he collected in the Chiddarcooping Nature Reserve, about 70 km (43 mi) north east of Merredin in 1989. The specific epithet (ascendens) means 'ascending', and refers to the characteristic orientation of the phyllodes.

== Distribution and habitat ==
This species of Acacia grows in woodland or low scrub on the scree slopes of breakaways and is only known from the Chiddarcooping Nature Reserve.

== Conservation status ==
Acacia ascendens is listed as "Priority Two" by the Western Australian Government Department of Biodiversity, Conservation and Attractions, meaning that it is poorly known and from only one or a few locations.

== See also ==
- List of Acacia species
