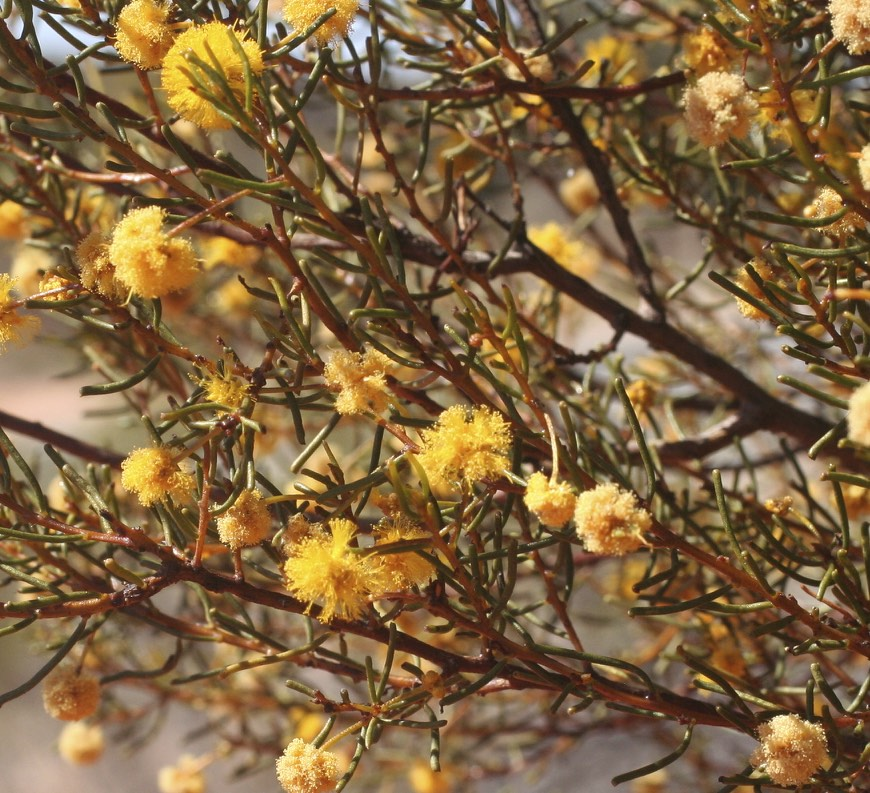

Scientific classification
- Kingdom: Plantae
- Clade: Tracheophytes
- Clade: Angiosperms
- Clade: Eudicots
- Clade: Rosids
- Order: Fabales
- Family: Fabaceae
- Subfamily: Caesalpinioideae
- Clade: Mimosoid clade
- Genus: Acacia
- Species: A. helmsiana

Binomial name
- Acacia helmsiana Maiden
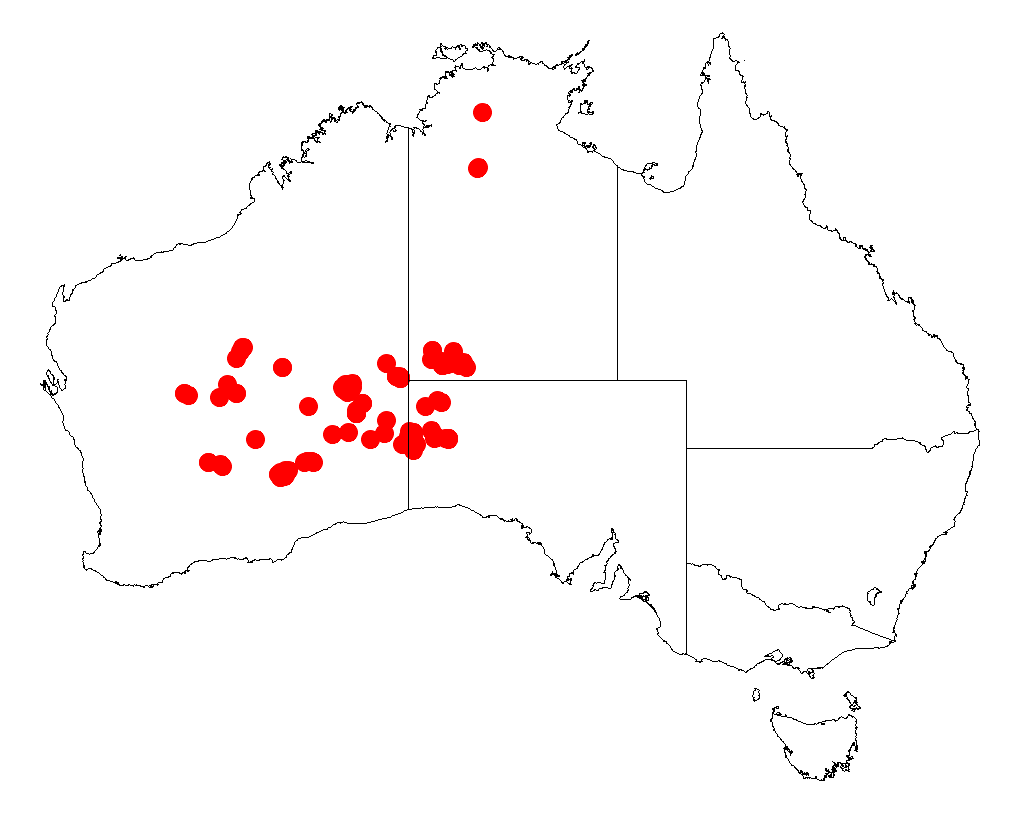
- Occurrence data from AVH

Synonyms
- Racosperma helmsianum (Maiden) Pedley

= Acacia helmsiana =

Helm's wattle

Species of legume

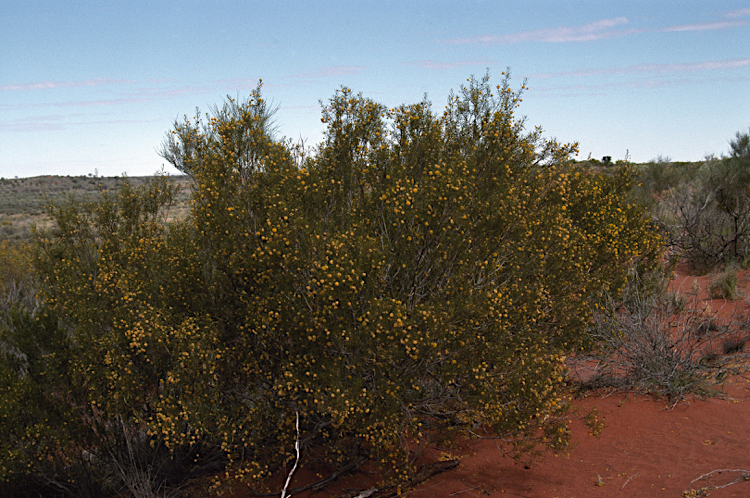
Habit near Uluru

Acacia helmsiana is a species of flowering plant in the family Fabaceae and is endemic to central and western Australia. It is a glabrous shrub with s-shaped to slightly curved, sometimes straight phyllodes, spherical heads of light- to mid-golden yellow flowers and strongly curved to coiled pods.

== Description ==
Acacia helmsiana is a glabrous shrub that typically grows to a height of up to 2 m (6 ft 7 in), its flowers and young growth resinous. Its phyllodes are s-shaped to slightly curved, sometimes straight, terete to subterete, 5–20 mm (0.20–0.79 in) long, 0.5–1.0 mm (0.020–0.039 in) wide with a beaked to hooked tip. The phyllodes are dark green, with one brownish vein on each side. The flowers are borne in a spherical head in axils on a peduncle 5–15 mm (0.20–0.59 in) long, each head with 20 to 30 light- to mid-golden yellow flowers. Flowering occurs from August to November, and the pods are strongly curved to 1½-coiled, up to 40 mm (1.6 in) long and 4 mm (0.16 in) wide.

== Taxonomy ==
Acacia helmsiana was first formally described in 1920 by the botanist Joseph Maiden in the Journal and Proceedings of the Royal Society of New South Wales from specimens collected by Richard Helms at "Camp 42" during the Elder Scientific Exploring Expedition. The specific epithet (helmsiana) honours Richard Helms who collected the type specimen.

== Distribution and habitat ==
This species of wattle is native from near Wiluna in central Western Australia to near Kata Tjuta in the far south west of Northern Territory and in the far west of South Australia. It grows on sand dunes and sand plains in red or yellow sandy soils, often with spinifex.

== See also ==
- List of Acacia species
