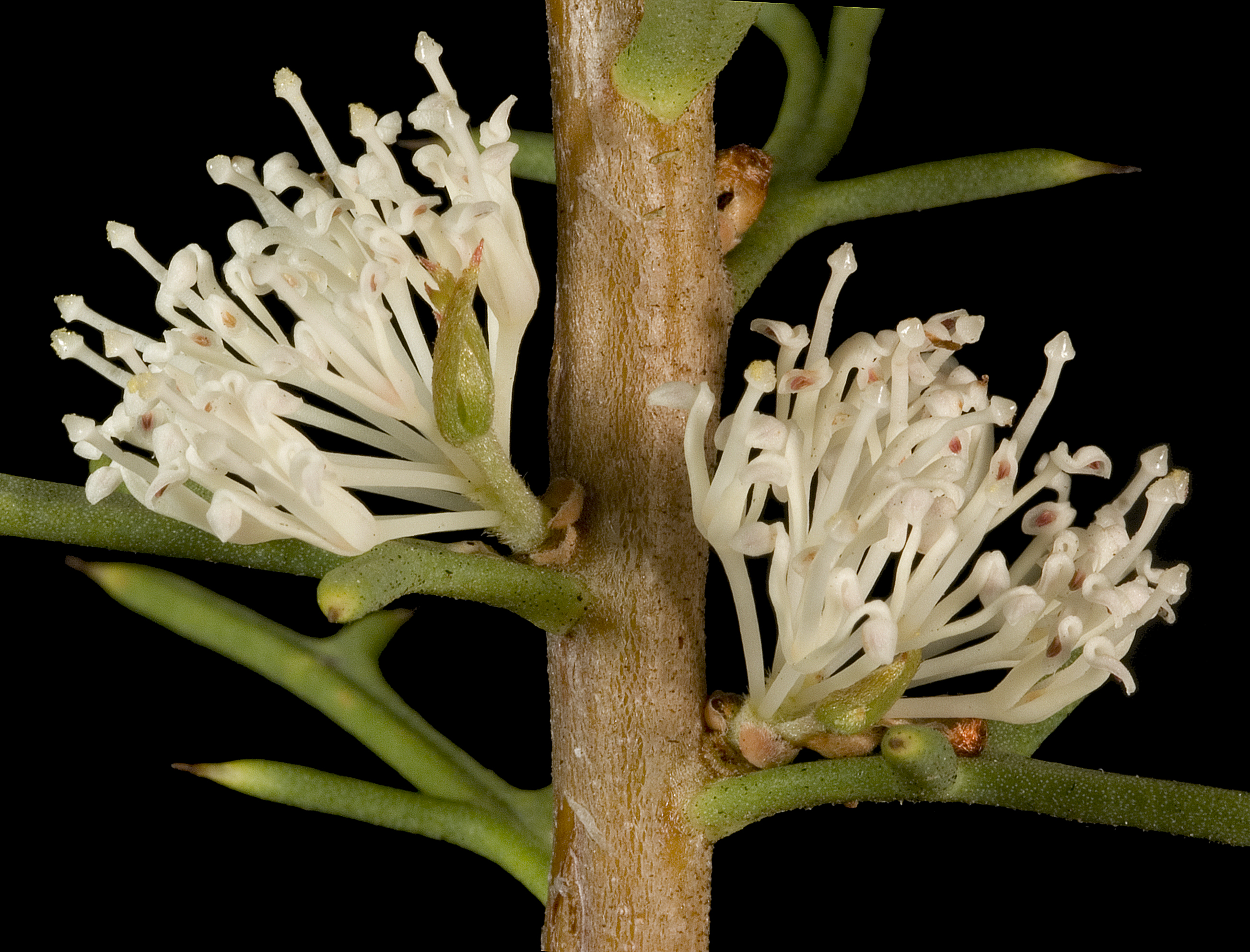

Scientific classification
- Kingdom: Plantae
- Clade: Tracheophytes
- Clade: Angiosperms
- Clade: Eudicots
- Order: Proteales
- Family: Proteaceae
- Genus: Hakea
- Species: H. varia

Binomial name
- Hakea varia R.Br.

= Hakea varia =

Species of shrub endemic to Western Australia

Hakea varia, commonly known as the variable-leaved hakea, is a shrub of the family Proteaceae and is endemic to Wheatbelt, South West, Great Southern and Goldfields–Esperance regions of Western Australia. It is a dense prickly shrub with creamy-white or yellow flowers and variably shaped leaves.

== Description ==
Hakea varia is an erect or spreading shrub typically growing to a height of 1 to 4 metres (3 to 13 ft) and 3 m (9.8 ft) wide and forms a lignotuber. The branchlets and young leaves have flattened, densely matted silky hairs, quickly becoming smooth. The stiff leaves may be variable on the one plant, needle-shaped, simple, more or less elliptic, egg-shaped, toothed, 1–4 cm (0.39–1.57 in) long and 2–5 mm (0.079–0.197 in) wide. All variations of leaves always end in a sharp point 1–2 mm (0.039–0.079 in) long. The inflorescence consists of 16–36 sweetly scented white-cream or yellow showy flowers in axillary clusters. The inflorescence stalk is 2.5–4 mm (0.098–0.157 in) long with coarse longish hairs. The over-lapping bracts are 4.5 mm (0.18 in) long and inner bracts rust coloured. The pedicels are 2–4 mm (0.079–0.157 in) long and the pistil 4–5 mm (0.16–0.20 in) long. The perianth 2.5–3.5 mm (0.098–0.138 in) long and white. Flowering occurs from July to November and the ovoid fruit are small, coarse, warty, or smooth, 1.5–2 cm (0.6–0.8 in) long, usually under 1 cm (0.4 in) wide, and ending with an outward curving sharp horn 3.5 mm (0.14 in) long.

== Taxonomy and naming ==
Variable-leaved hakea was first formally described by Robert Brown and published the description in Transactions of the Linnean Society of London. Named from the Latin varius - variable referring to the many differing leaf shapes.

== Distribution and habitat ==
Hakea varia is a widespread species growing from north of Perth around the coast to Augusta and Esperance. Prefers winter wet situations on sand, clay, loam and gravel. A frost tolerant species favouring a sunny or shady aspect. A dense prickly shrub good for wildlife habitat.

== Conservation status ==
Hakea varia is classified as "not threatened" by the Western Australian Government Department of Parks and Wildlife.
