= Turpentine (disambiguation) =

Turpentine is the oleoresin of conifers (crude turpentine) or the volatile oil part thereof (oil of turpentine).

Turpentine may also refer to:

- The resin of terebinth, the original meaning of turpentine
- White spirit, the cheaper, mineral oil based replacement for turpentine
- "Turpentine" (song), a 1990 song by grunge band Hole
- "Turpentine", a song by pop-punk band Blink-182 on their 2023 album One More Time...
- "Turpentine", a song by Kevin Coyne from his 1975 album Matching Head and Feet
- Mr. Turpentine, Charlie Bucket's schoolteacher and fictional character in Willy Wonka and the Chocolate Factory

== Plants ==
- Scrub turpentine (disambiguation)
- Turpentine bush (disambiguation)
- Turpentine tree (disambiguation)
