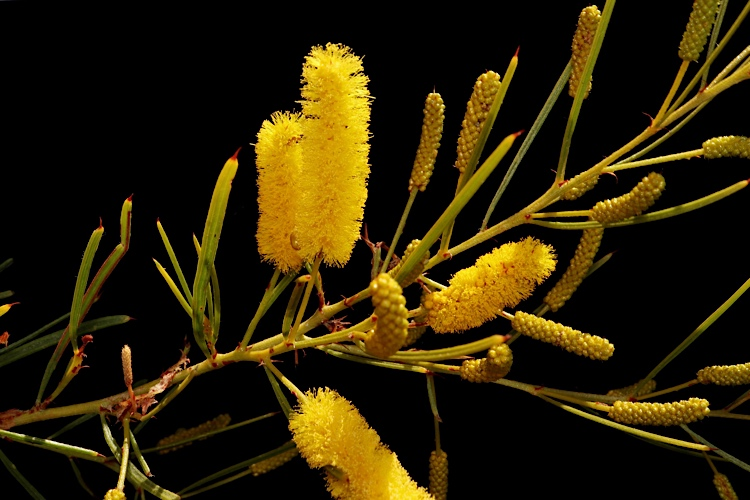
- About 32km east of Mount Isa

Scientific classification
- Kingdom: Plantae
- Clade: Tracheophytes
- Clade: Angiosperms
- Clade: Eudicots
- Clade: Rosids
- Order: Fabales
- Family: Fabaceae
- Subfamily: Caesalpinioideae
- Clade: Mimosoid clade
- Genus: Acacia
- Species: A. chisholmii

Binomial name
- Acacia chisholmii F.M.Bailey
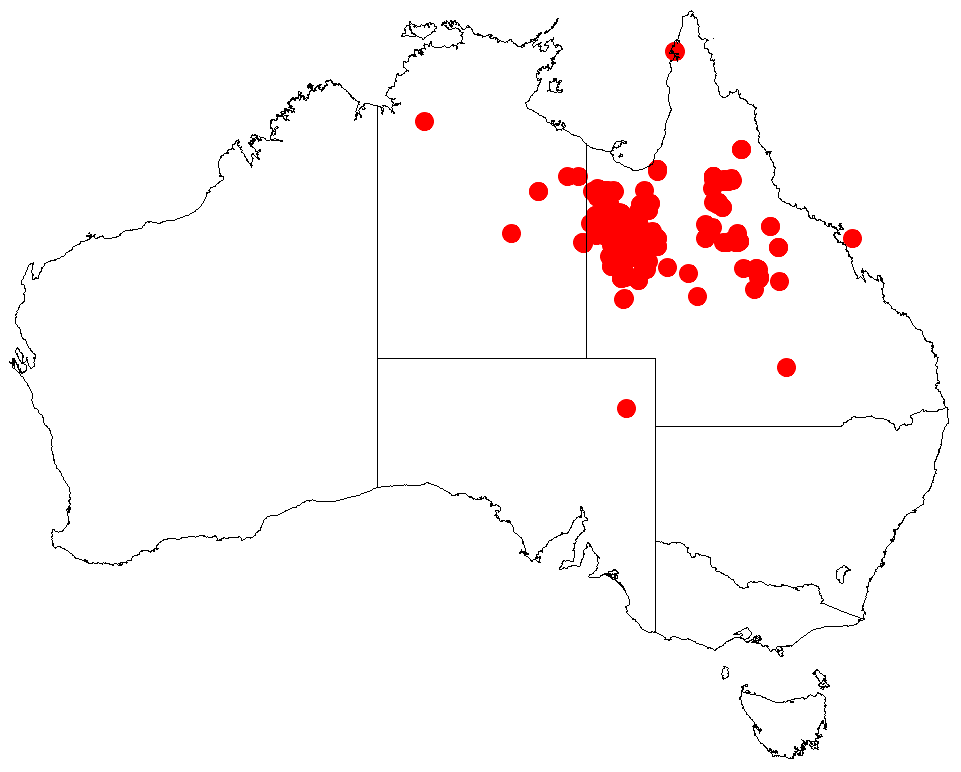
- Occurrence data from AVH

Synonyms
- Acacia costinervis Domin; Racosperma chisholmii (F.M.Bailey) Pedley

= Acacia chisholmii =

Turpentine bush

Species of legume

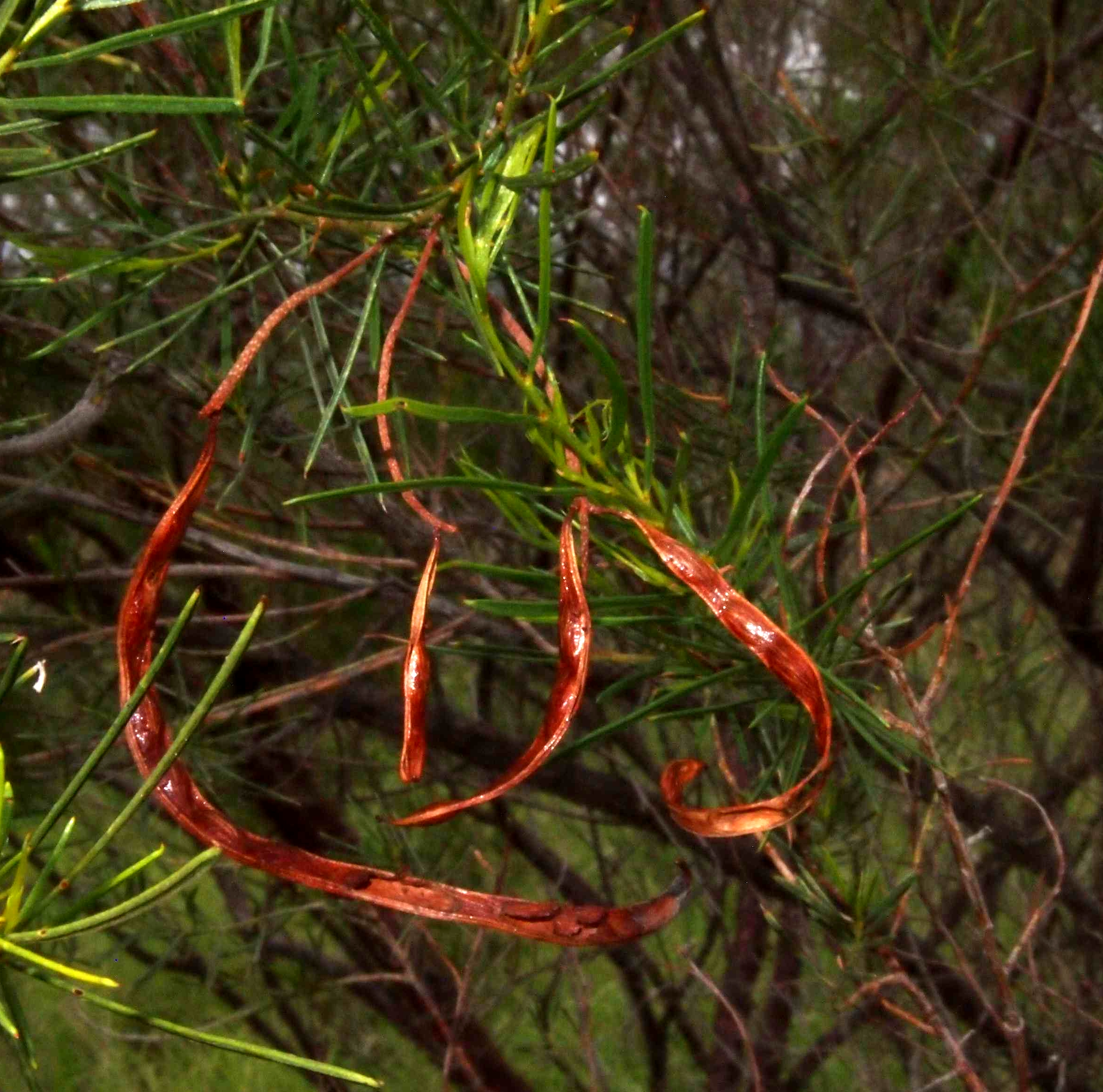
Seed pods

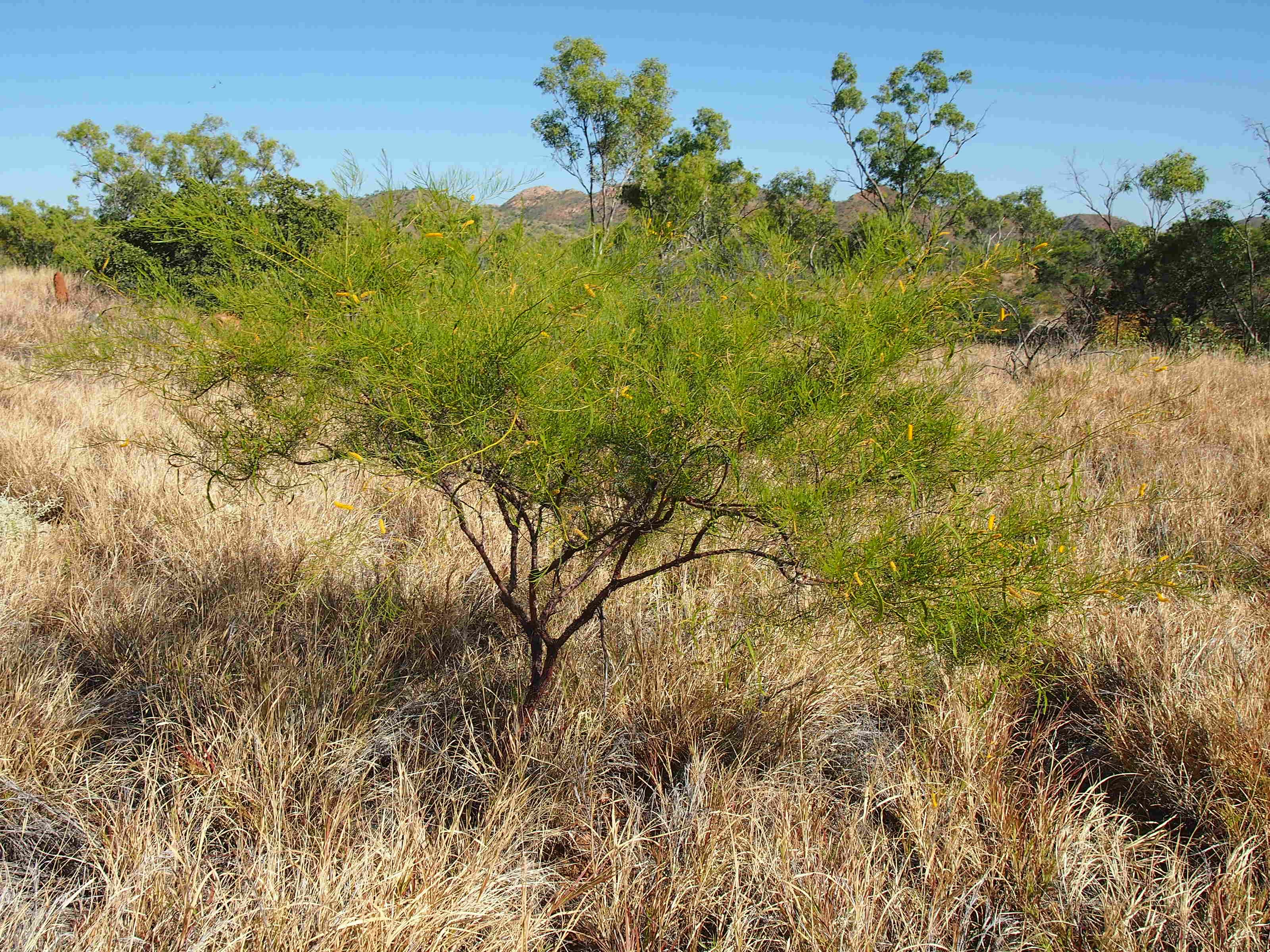
Habit

Acacia chisholmii, commonly known as turpentine bush or Chisholm's wattle, is a species of flowering plant in the family Fabaceae and is endemic to arid areas of north-eastern Australia. It is a shrub with many spreading stems, erect, linear phyllodes, spikes of golden yellow flowers and linear, curved, leathery pods.

== Description ==
Acacia chisholmii is a multi-stemmed, spreading shrub that typically grows to a height of up to 4 m (13 ft) and has minni ritchi bark. Its branchlets are angular, purplish brown or red-brown with small teeth on the edges. the phyllodes are erect, linear, flat 15–55 mm (0.59–2.17 in) long, 0.7–2 mm (0.028–0.079 in) and thinly leathery with a sharply pointed end and two prominent veins. The flowers are golden yellow and borne in spikes 13–28 mm (0.51–1.10 in) long. Flowering occurs between March and August and the pods are linear, more or less flat but curved, more or less constricted between the seeds, 25–140 mm (0.98–5.51 in) long and leathery. The seeds are dark brown to black, narrowly oblong and 3.6–4.5 mm (0.14–0.18 in) long.

This species is related to Acacia lysiphloia and Acacia trachycarpa, Acacia effusa and Acacia gracillima. It is also able to hybridize with Acacia monticola.

== Taxonomy ==
Acacia chisholmii was first formally described in 1899 by Frederick Manson Bailey in the Queensland Agricultural Journal from specimens collected by W.R. Chisholm near Prairie. The specific epithet (chisholmii) is presumably named in honour of the collector of the type specimens.

== Distribution and habitat ==
Turpentine bush occurs in western parts of Queensland and westwards to the Mount Isa–Cloncurry area where it on stony often lateritic plains with shallow, sandy soils or in undulating country and on escarpments in grassland or Eucalypt woodland and spinifex communities. A single collection has been made near Lake Nash in the Northern Territory.

== Conservation status ==
Acacia chisholmii is listed as "near threatened" under the Northern Territory Government Territory Parks and Wildlife Conservation Act, but as of "least concern" under the Queensland Government Nature Conservation Act 1992.

== See also ==
- List of Acacia species
