= Eremophila simulans =

Scientific classification
- Kingdom: Plantae
- Clade: Embryophytes
- Clade: Tracheophytes
- Clade: Spermatophytes
- Clade: Angiosperms
- Clade: Eudicots
- Clade: Asterids
- Order: Lamiales
- Family: Scrophulariaceae
- Genus: Eremophila
- Species: E. simulans

Binomial name
- Eremophila simulans Chinnock

Species of flowering plant

Eremophila simulans is a flowering plant in the figwort family, Scrophulariaceae and is endemic to Western Australia. It is an erect shrub with broad, serrated leaves and violet to purple flowers.

== Description ==
Eremophila simulans is an erect shrub which grows to a height of between 0.6 and 2.0 m (2 and 7 ft). Its leaves and branches are sticky and shiny due to the presence of resin. The leaves are elliptic to egg-shaped, hairy along their margins and often on their surfaces although the hairs may be hidden by the coating of resin. They are mostly 8.5–17 mm (0.3–0.7 in) long, 4–8.5 mm (0.2–0.3 in) wide and have serrated edges.

The flowers are borne singly in leaf axils on hairy, slightly sticky stalks 12.5–23 mm (0.5–0.9 in) long. There are 5 greenish-purple to reddish-brown, overlapping, hairy, egg-shaped to almost circular sepals which are 6–20 mm (0.2–0.8 in) long. The size and shape of the sepals varies with subspecies. The petals are 19–26 mm (0.7–1 in) long and are joined at their lower end to form a tube. The petal tube is purple or violet on the outside and white with bands of reddish-brown inside the tube. The outside of the petal tube and lobes is hairy, the inside surface of the lobes is glabrous and the inside of the tube is filled with woolly hairs. The 4 stamens are enclosed in the petal tube. Flowering time is from August to October and is followed by fruits which are dry, woody, oval shaped, hairy and 6.5–9 mm (0.3–0.4 in) long.

== Taxonomy and naming ==
The species was first formally described by Robert Chinnock in 2007 and the description was published in Eremophila and Allied Genera: A Monograph of the Plant Family Myoporaceae. The specific epithet (simulans) is a Latin word meaning "imitating" or "copying", referring to the similarity of the features of this species to those of Eremophila georgei.

There are three subspecies:

- Eremophila simulans Chinnock subsp. simulans which has elliptic to egg-shaped sepals and simple hairs on its branches and leaves;
- Eremophila simulans subsp. lapidensis Chinnock which has egg-shaped sepals, both simple and glandular hairs on its branches and leaves, and outer sepals which are less than 12 mm (0.5 in) long after flowering;
- Eremophila simulans Chinnock subsp. megacalyx which has elliptic to almost circular sepals, both simple and glandular hairs on its leaves and branches, and outer sepals which are 15–20 mm (0.6–0.8 in) long after flowering .

== Distribution and habitat ==
Subspecies simulans is the most common of the subspecies and occurs on rocky hills and plains between Cue and the Weld Range in the Murchison biogeographic region.

Subspecies lapidensis grows in sandy soils between Sandstone and Meeketharra in the Murchison biogeographic region.

Subspecies megacalyx grows in rocky and sandy clay soil between the Murchison Settlement and Meekatharra in the Murchison biogeographic region.

== Conservation ==
Subspecies simulans and lapidensis are classified as "not threatened" but subspecies megacalyx is classified as "Priority Three" by the Western Australian Government Department of Parks and Wildlife meaning that it is poorly known and known from only a few locations but is not under imminent threat.

== Use in horticulture ==
This eremophila has only recently been introduced into gardens and details about its horticulture are not well known. It has been propagated by grafting onto Myoporum rootstock and grows well in free-draining soil in full sun or part shade. It appears to be drought tolerant but its response to frost is not known.
