= Turpentine bush =

Turpentine bush may refer to:

Australian plants

- Acacia lysiphloia, also known as the turpentine wattle
- Beyeria lechenaultia, pale turpentine bush
- Beyeria opaca, dark turpentine bush
- Beyeria subtecta, Kangaroo Island turpentine bush
- Eremophila clarkei
- Eremophila sturtii

Other plants

- Ericameria laricifolia, native to the southwestern United States and northern Mexico

== See also ==
- Scrub turpentine
- Turpentine tree
