= Turpentine tree =

Turpentine tree may refer to:

- Pistacia terebinthus, native to the Mediterranean region
- Pistacia atlantica, native to the Middle East, the Maghreb, the Canary Islands and Southeast Europe
- Pistacia eurycarpa, native to West Asia
- Canarium australianum (brown cudgeree), native to Australia and Papua New Guinea
- Gardenia pyriformis, native to northern Australia
- Syncarpia glomulifera, native to Australia
- Bursera simaruba, native to the tropical and subtropical Americas, called "turpentine" in the Virgin Islands

== See also ==
- Scrub turpentine
- Turpentine bush
