= Scrub turpentine =

Scrub turpentine is a common name for several plants and may refer to:

- Canarium australianum, native to Australia and Papua New Guinea
- Rhodamnia rubescens, native to eastern Australia

== See also ==
- Turpentine bush
- Turpentine tree
