= Acacia effusa =

Conservation status
- Priority Three — Poorly Known Taxa (DEC)

Scientific classification
- Kingdom: Plantae
- Clade: Tracheophytes
- Clade: Angiosperms
- Clade: Eudicots
- Clade: Rosids
- Order: Fabales
- Family: Fabaceae
- Subfamily: Caesalpinioideae
- Clade: Mimosoid clade
- Genus: Acacia
- Species: A. effusa

Binomial name
- Acacia effusa Maslin
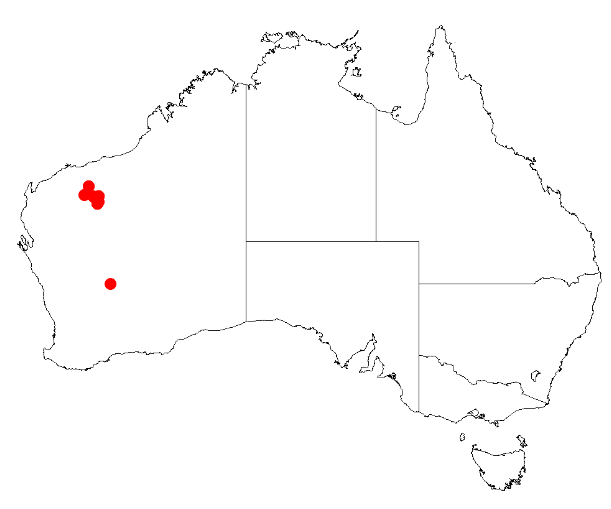
- Occurrence data from AVH

Synonyms
- Racosperma effusum (Maslin) Pedley

Species of legume

Acacia effusa, commonly known as Punurunha minni ritchi, is a species of flowering plant in the family Fabaceae and is endemic to inland Western Australia. It is a low, dense, spreading, somewhat sticky shrub with minni ritchi bark, ascending oblong to narrowly elliptic phyllodes, spikes of bright golden yellow flowers and leathery, curved to coiled pods slightly raised over the seeds.

== Description ==
Acacia effusa is a low, dense, spreading, somewhat sticky shrub that typically grows to a height of up to 1 m (3 ft 3 in) and has grey or greyish red, minni ritchi bark. Its branchlets are terete and covered with dense woolly hairs, but become glabrous as they mature. The phyllodes are ascending, oblong to narrowly elliptic, 9–15 mm (0.35–0.59 in) long and 3–7 mm (0.12–0.28 in) wide with a prominent midvein. The flowers are bright golden yellow and borne in spikes 10–18 mm (0.39–0.71 in) long, increasing to 25 mm (0.98 in) long in the fruiting stage. Flowering occurs from May to September, and the pods are curved to coiled, sometimes twisted, up to 85 mm (3.3 in) long, 5.5–7.5 mm (0.22–0.30 in) wide, leathery and glabrous. The seeds are round to very broadly elliptic, 3–5 mm (0.12–0.20 in) long and dark tan.

== Taxonomy and naming ==
Acacia effusa was first formally described in 1982 by the botanist Bruce Maslin in the journal Nuytsia from specimens collected 6 km (3.7 mi) north of Marandoo (which is situated just south of Mount Bruce) on the road to Tom Price. The specific epithet (effusa) "refers to the characteristic wide-spreading growth habit of this species". The common name (Punurunha minni ritchi) is derived from the Kurrama language name for Mount Bruce, and "the term minni ritchi, which describes the habit of the bark to shed in long, curling strips".

== Distribution and habitat ==
Punurunha minni ritchi grows in rocky red loam on lower slopes, particularly along creeks, and is only known from Hamersley Range National Park in the Pilbara bioregion of Western Australia.

== Conservation status ==
Acacia effusa is listed as "Priority Three" by the Government of Western Australia Department of Biodiversity, Conservation and Attractions meaning that it is poorly known and known from only a few locations but is not under imminent threat.

== See also ==
- List of Acacia species
