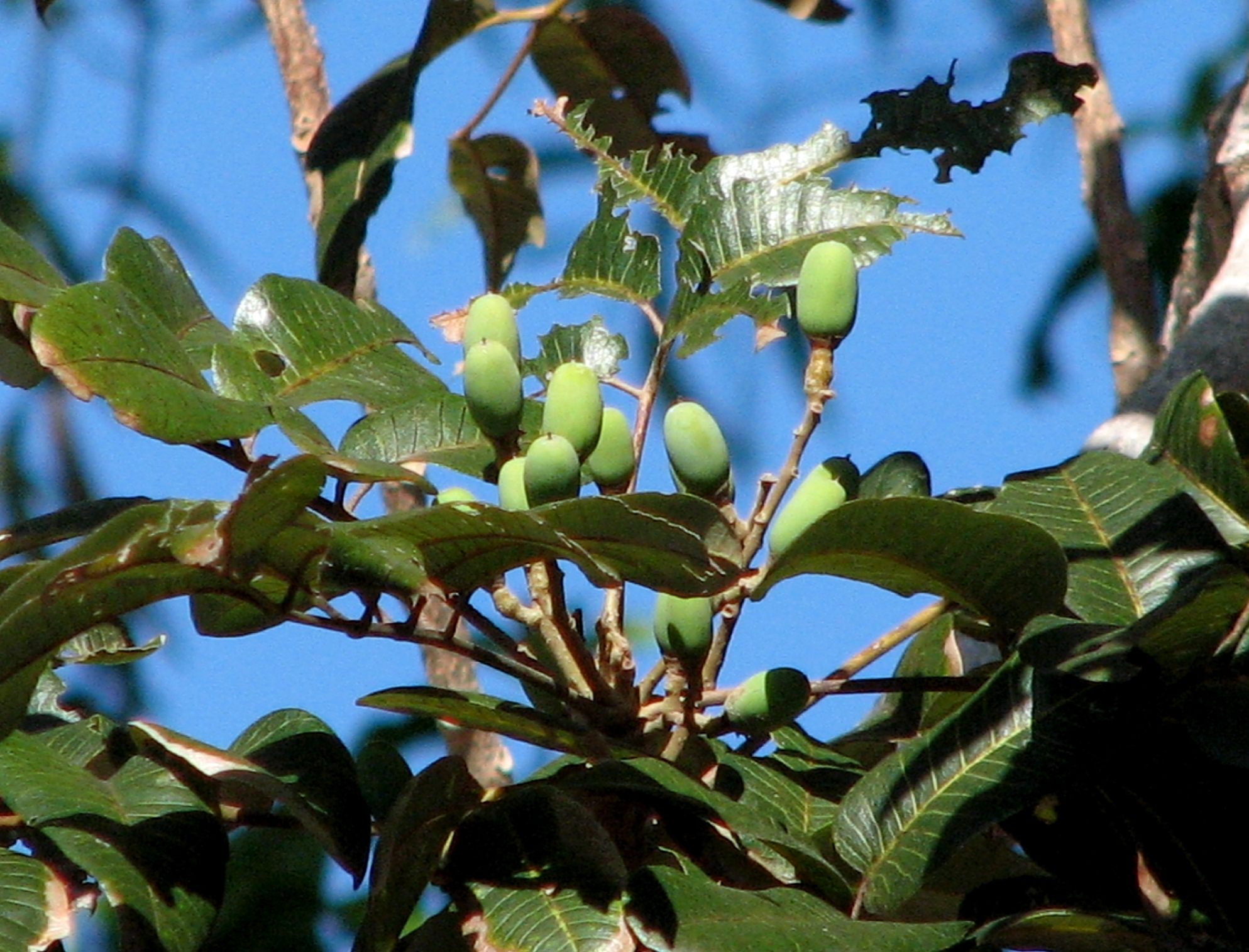
- Fruit and foliage

Conservation status
- Least Concern (NCA)

Scientific classification
- Kingdom: Plantae
- Clade: Tracheophytes
- Clade: Angiosperms
- Clade: Eudicots
- Clade: Rosids
- Order: Sapindales
- Family: Burseraceae
- Genus: Canarium
- Species: C. australianum

Binomial name
- Canarium australianum F.Muell.

Synonyms
- Sonzaya australiana (F.Muell.) Marchand

= Canarium australianum =

Scrub turpentine

Species of tree

Canarium australianum, commonly known as scrub turpentine, is a species of tree in the family Burseraceae native to Australia and Papua New Guinea. Other common names include mango bark, carrot wood, parsnip wood, Melville Island white beech and brown cudgerie.

== Description ==
Canarium australianum is a tree growing up to 30 m (98 ft) tall. The trunk has a rough grey bark and it may be buttressed. The large compound leaves can reach 37 cm (15 in) in length with between 7 and 15 leaflets that usually measure about 14 by 5 cm (5.5 by 2.0 in), sometimes larger. The leaflets are normally glabrous; the midrib and lateral veins are raised on the upper surface, and have a distinctive pale yellow colour.

The inflorescences are panicles about 25–30 cm (9.8–11.8 in) long produced from the leaf axils. Flowers are fragrant and have 3 pale green or cream petals measuring about 4–6 mm (0.16–0.24 in) long. This species is dioecious, meaning that pistillate (functionally female) and staminate (functionally male) flowers are borne on separate plants.

The fruit is a dark blue or grey, ovoid drupe measuring 2–3 cm (0.79–1.18 in) long and containing a single seed.

== Taxonomy ==
This species was first described by the Victorian state botanist Ferdinand von Mueller, based on material supplied to him from the Burdekin River by Eugene Fitzalan, and by Mr Henne who collected specimens from Sweers and Bentinck Islands in the Gulf of Carpentaria. It was published in Mueller's book Fragmenta phytographiæ Australiæ in 1862.

=== Subspecies ===
Three varieties are recognised:

- C. australianum var. australianum F.Muell.
- C. australianum var. glabrum Leenh. — styptic tree, jalgir (Bardi language) — type specimen from Bickerton Island in the Gulf of Carpentaria
- C. australianum var. velutinum Hewson —jalgir (Bardi language) — type specimen from Cape Domett, north of Kununurra, Western Australia

== Distribution and habitat ==
The scrub turpentine is widely distributed across northern Australia from the Kimberley region of Western Australia, through the Northern Territory to eastern Queensland, where it is found from the Torres Strait Islands southwards almost as far as Mackay. It also occurs in New Guinea. It inhabits rainforest, monsoon forest and open forests at altitudes from near sea level to about 700 m (2,300 ft).

All three varieties are found in Australia, while only the varieties C.a. australianum and C.a. glabrum occur in New Guinea.

== Gallery ==
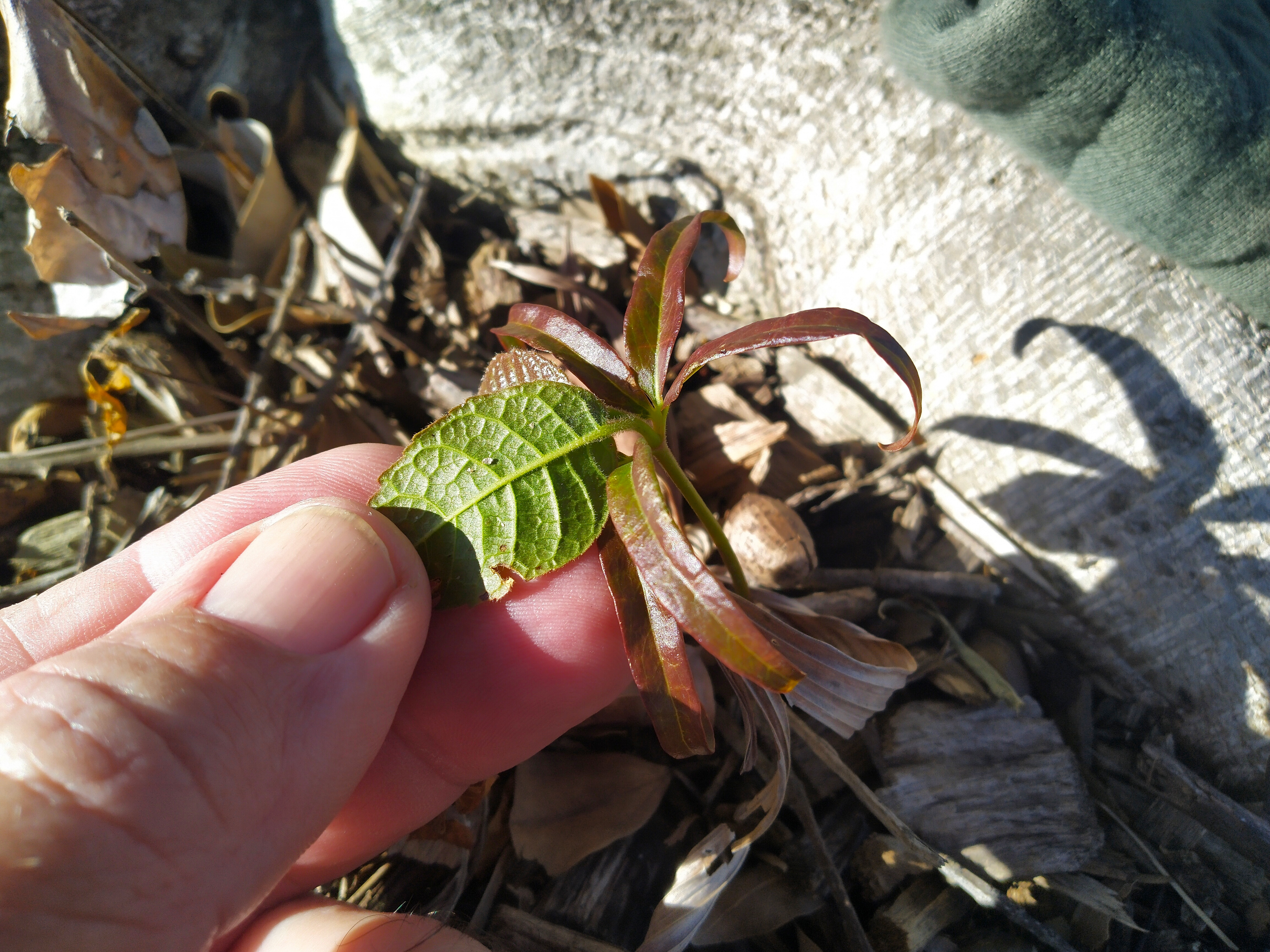
Seedling

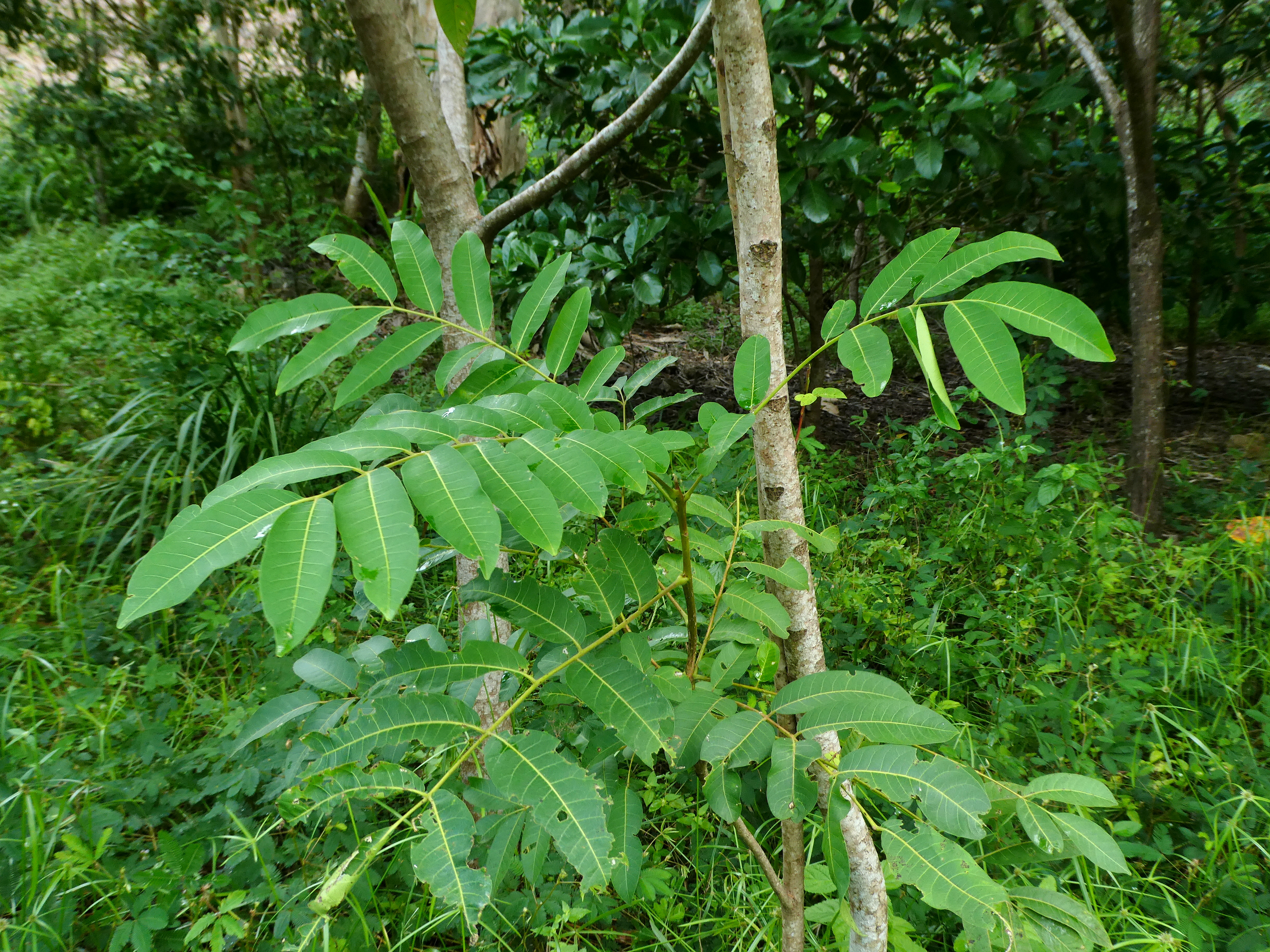
Young sapling

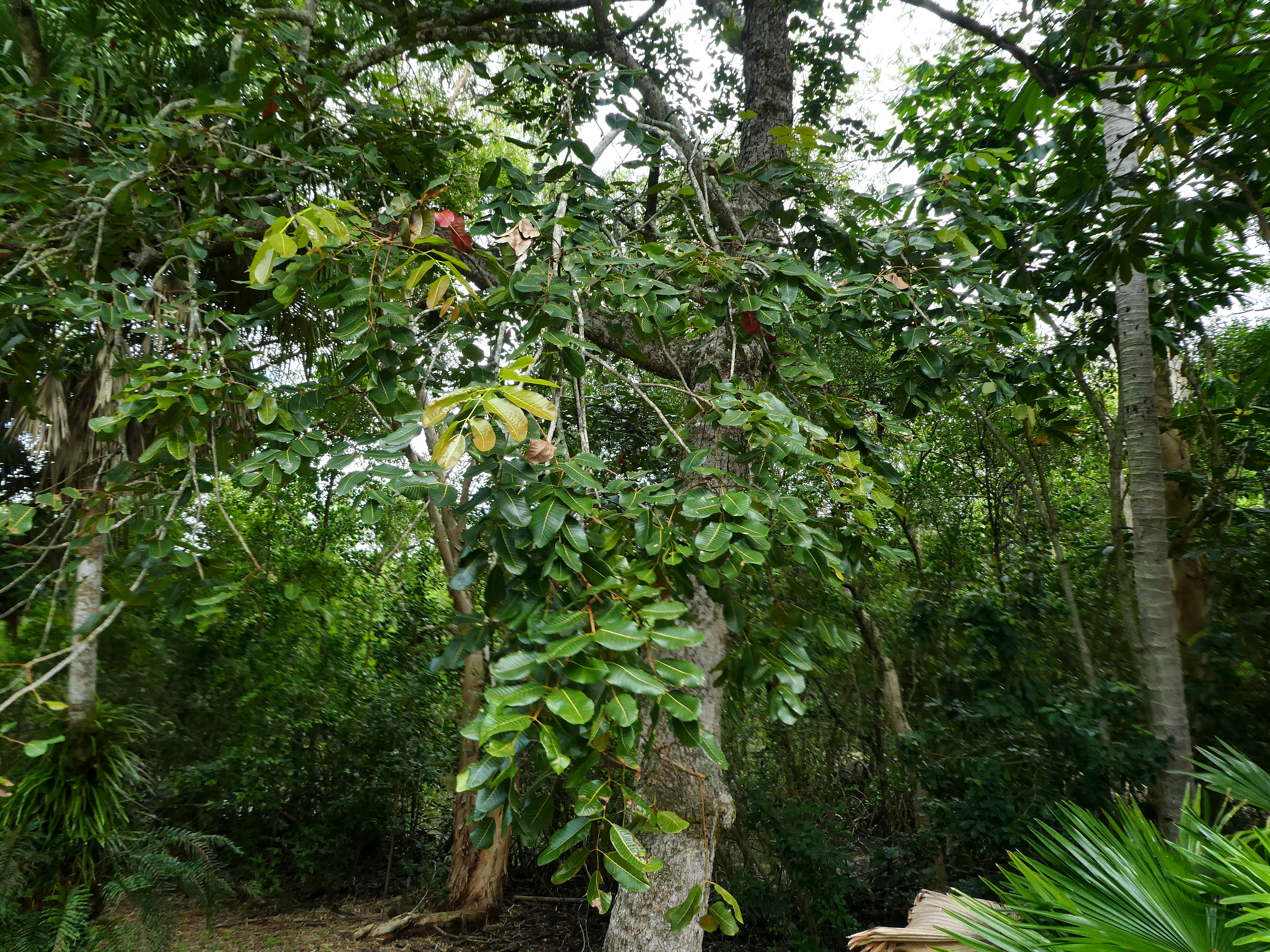
Tree in Cairns Botanic Gardens

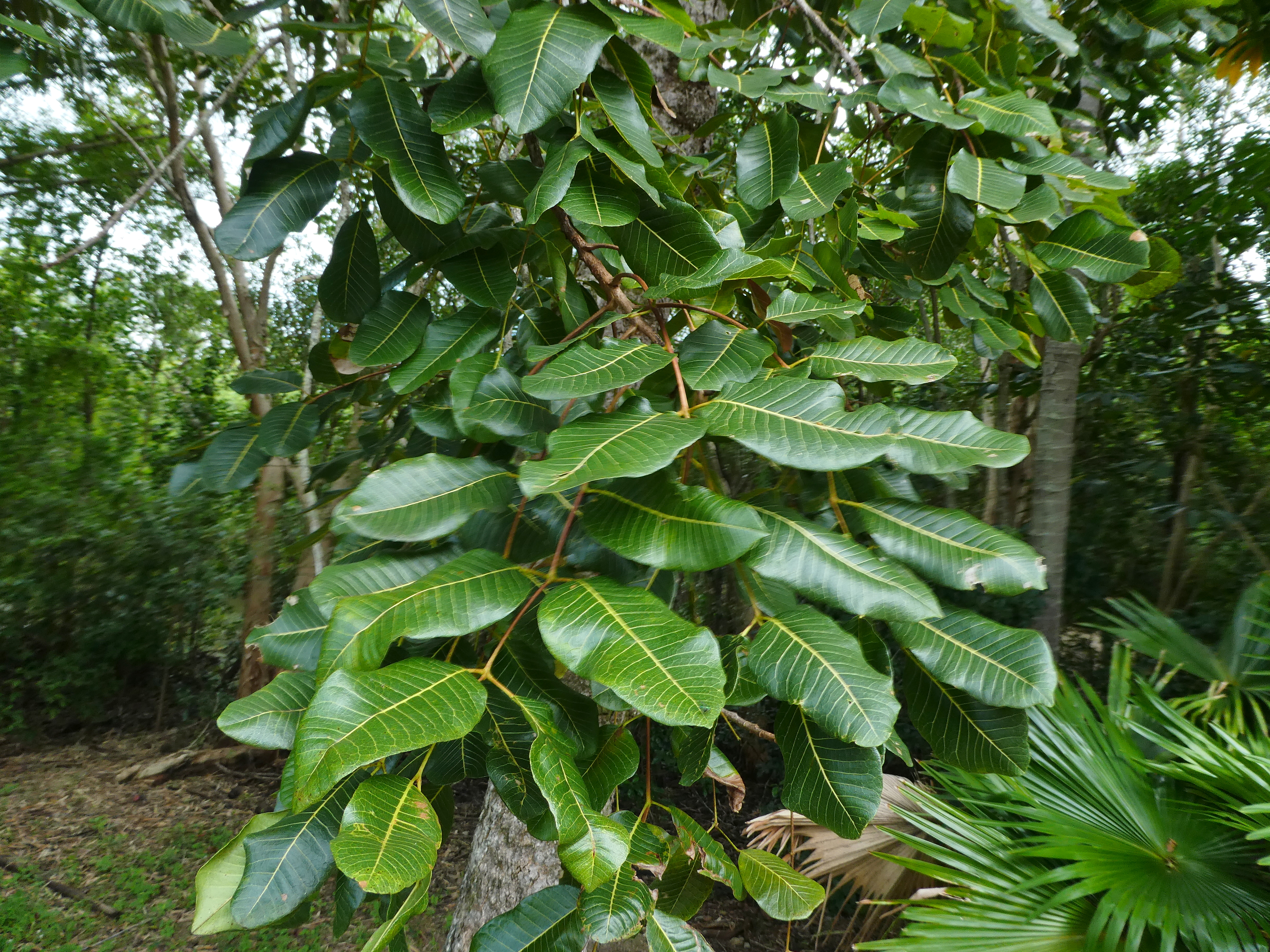
Foliage

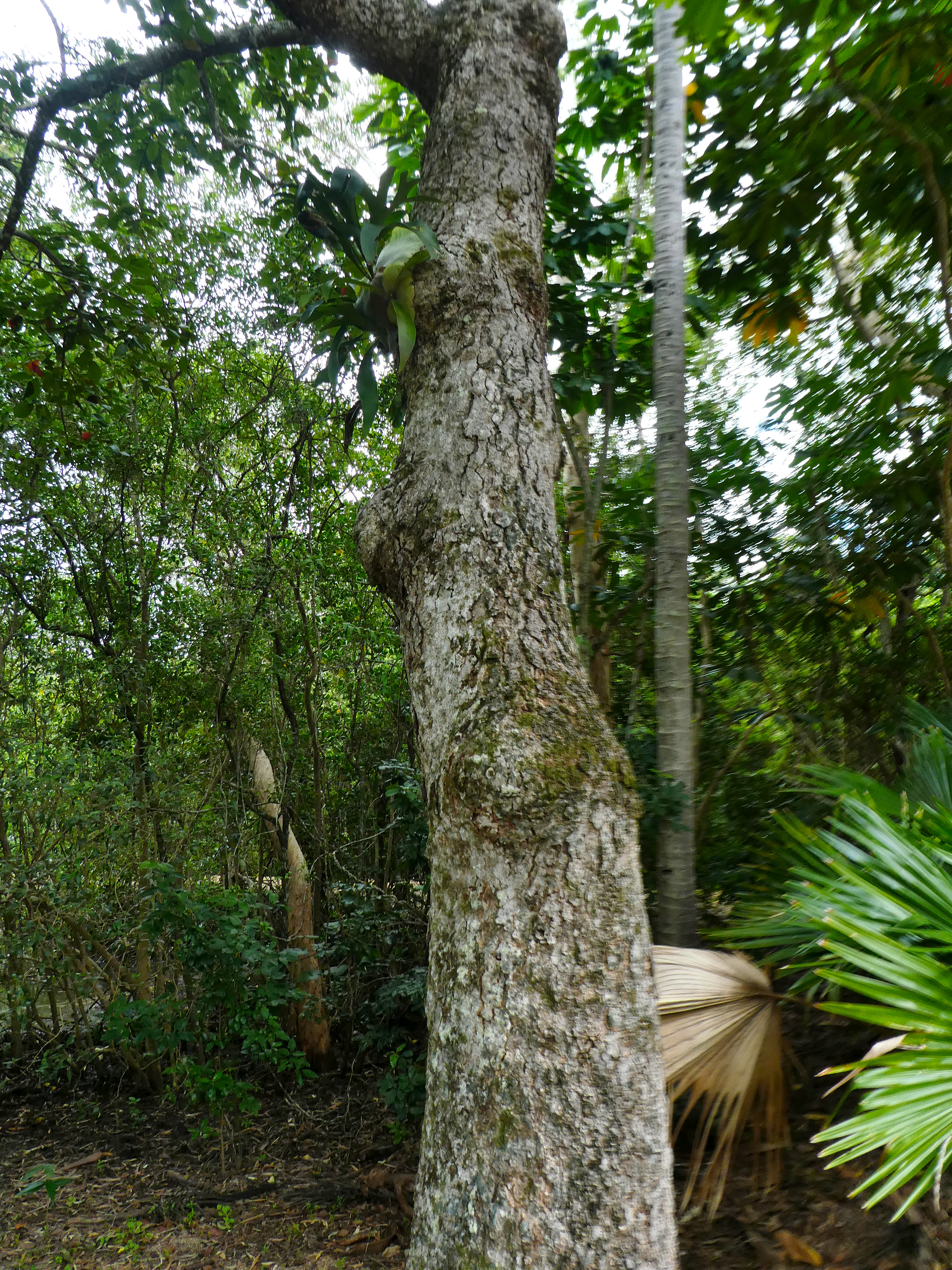
Trunk
