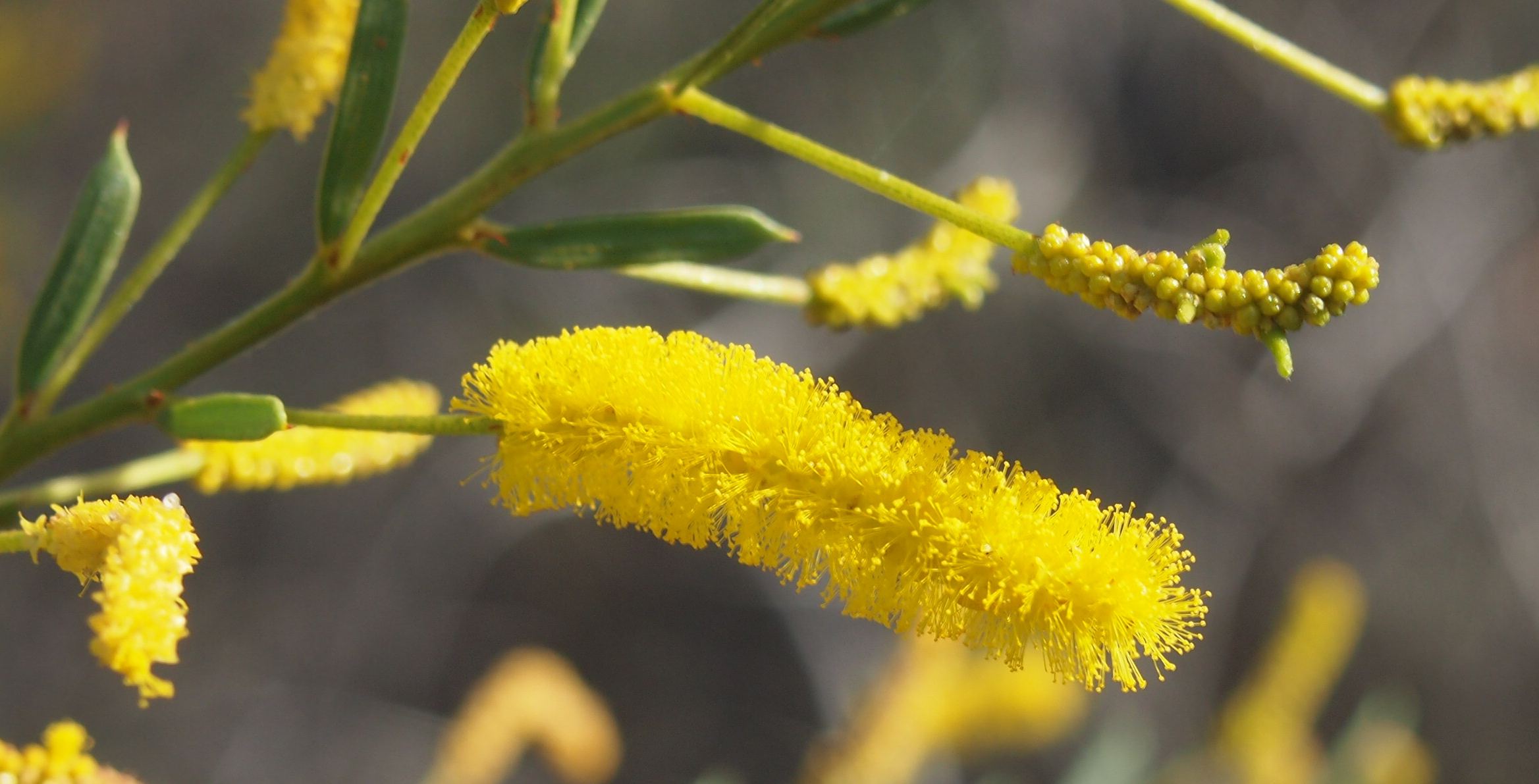

Scientific classification
- Kingdom: Plantae
- Clade: Tracheophytes
- Clade: Angiosperms
- Clade: Eudicots
- Clade: Rosids
- Order: Fabales
- Family: Fabaceae
- Subfamily: Caesalpinioideae
- Clade: Mimosoid clade
- Genus: Acacia
- Species: A. lysiphloia

Binomial name
- Acacia lysiphloia F.Muell.
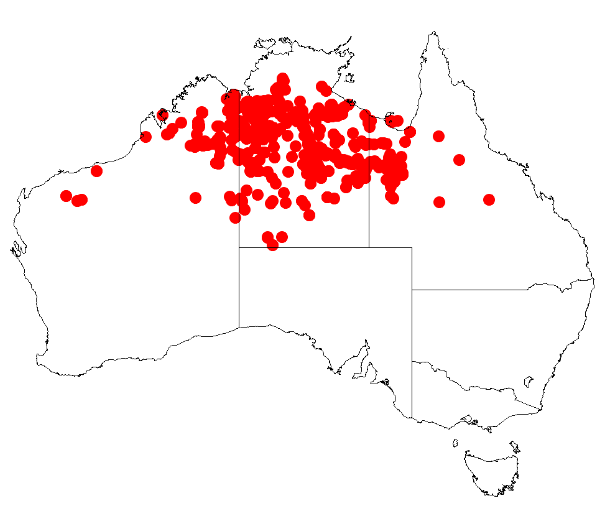
- Occurrence data from AVH

Synonyms
- Racosperma lysiphloia (F.Muell.) Pedley; Racosperma lysiphloium Pedley orth. var.

= Acacia lysiphloia =

Species of legume

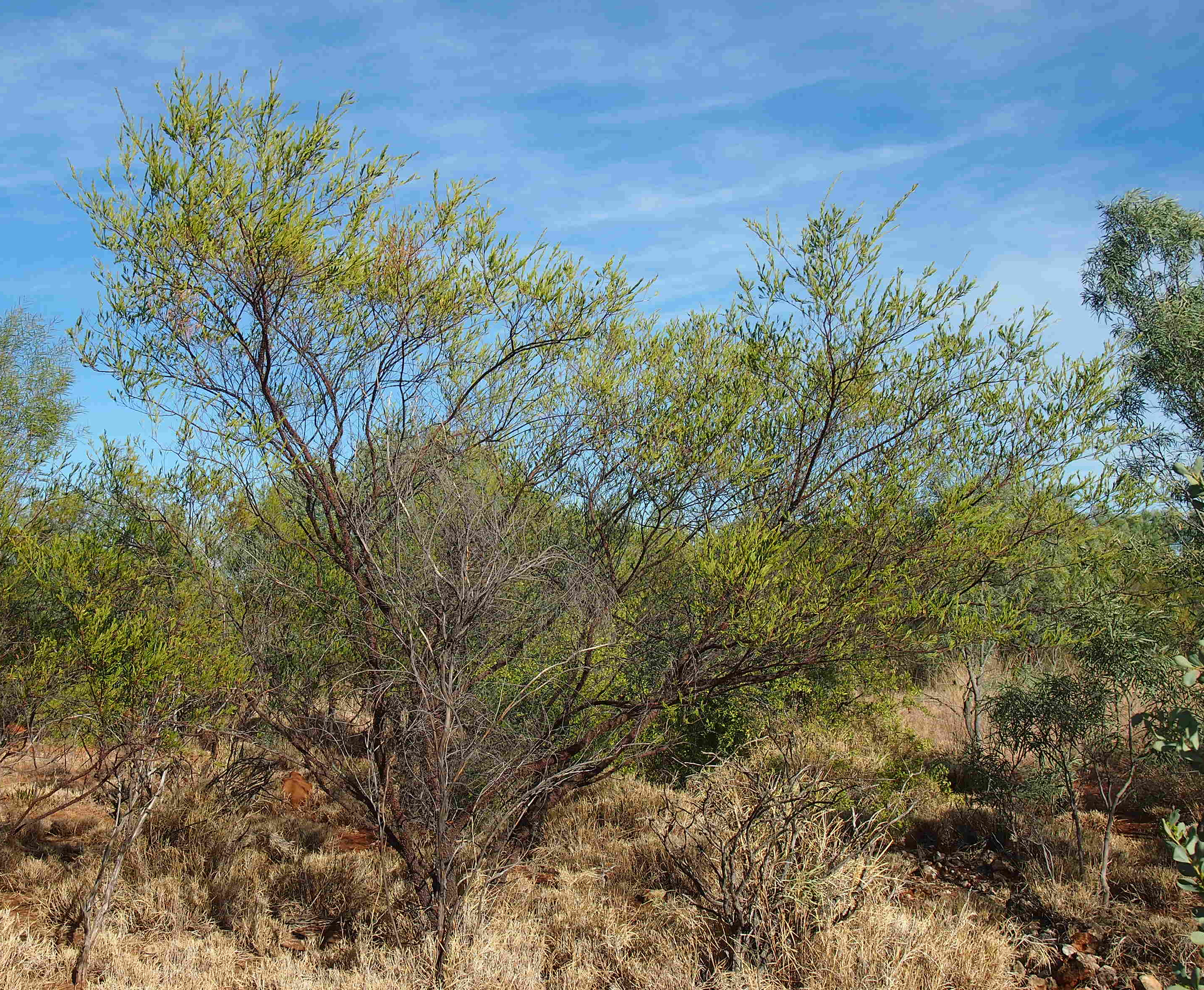
Habit

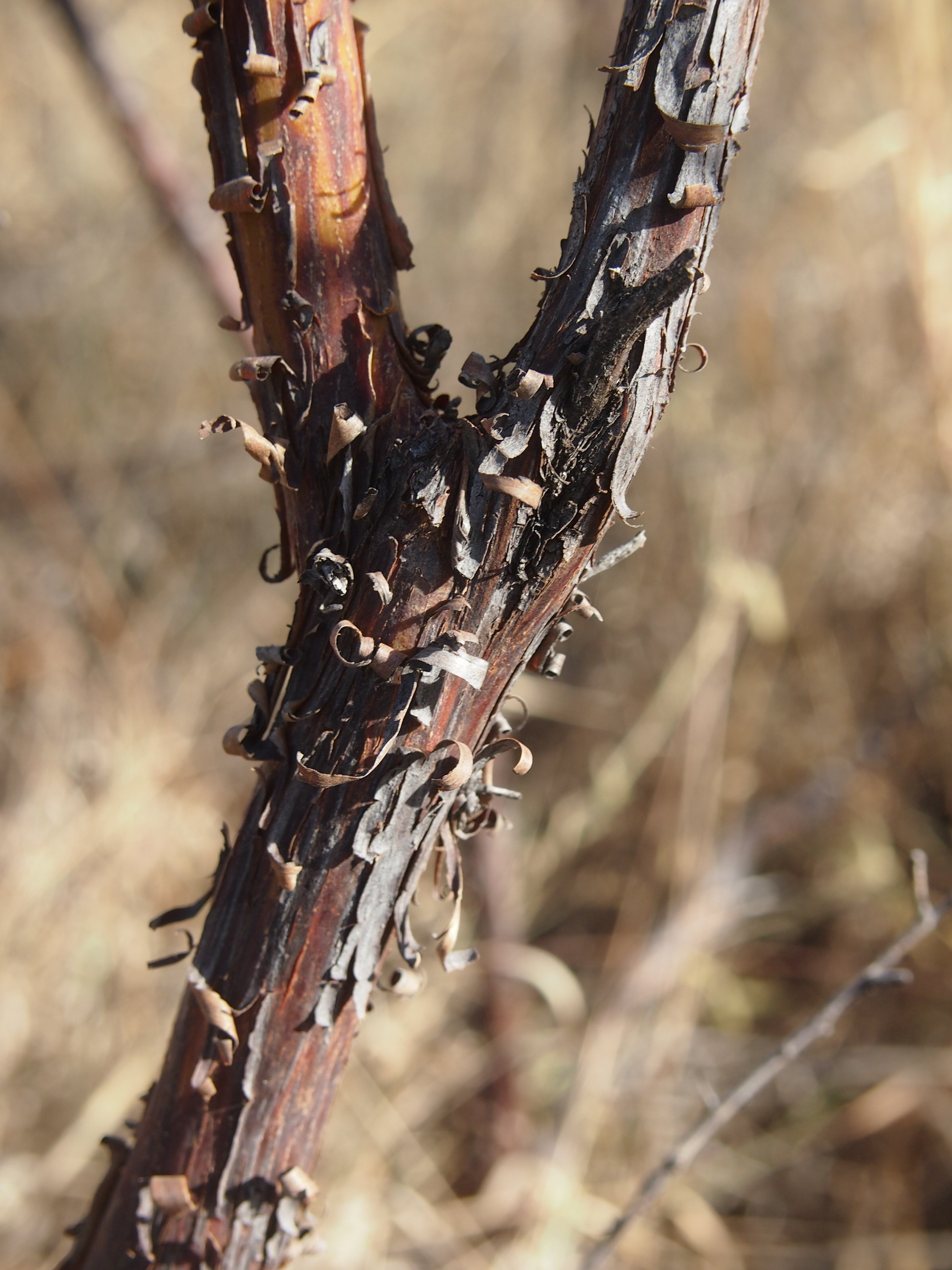
Bark

Acacia lysiphloia commonly known as turpentine, turpentine bush or turpentine wattle, is a species of flowering plant in the family Fabaceae and is endemic to northern Australia. It is a spreading, multi-stemmed, often sticky shrub with minni ritchi bark, angular branchlets, linear, oblique phyllodes, spikes of golden yellow flowers, and straight to strongly curved, thinly leathery to firmly papery pods.

== Description ==
Acacia lysiphloia is a spreading, often sticky, multi-stemmed shrub that typically grows to a height of 1–4 m (3–13 ft) with red-brown, minni ritchi type bark and angular, glabrous, green branchlets with fawn ridges. Its phyllodes are oblique, linear to egg-shaped, 10–50 mm (0.39–1.97 in) long and 1.2–5 mm (0.047–0.197 in) wide and flat. There are two to five conspicuous, raised longitudinal veins on the phyllodes and persistent, triangular stipules 0.5–2 mm (0.020–0.079 in) long at the base. The flowers are golden yellow, and borne on spikes 7–37 mm (0.28–1.46 in) long. Flowering occurs from May to September, and the pods are straight to strongly curved, 20–100 mm (0.79–3.94 in) long, 6–9 mm (0.24–0.35 in) wide, thinly leathery to firmly papery, and slightly or variably more constricted between the seeds or straight-sided.

== Taxonomy ==
Acacia lysiphloia was first formally described in 1859 by Ferdinand von Mueller in the Journal of the Proceedings of the Linnean Society, Botany. The specific epithet (lysiphloia) means 'loose bark'.

== Distribution and habitat ==
Turpentine bush is common in arid tropical Australia, mainly in the Kimberley region of Western Australia through the Northern Territory and into north-west Queensland between 14ºS–23ºS and 126ºE–144ºE. It grows on sandy or gravelly soils, often on laterite, on plains and hillsides, frequently along streams in eucalypt and Acacia woodland, low scrub or grassland.

== See also ==
- List of Acacia species
