= Profusa =

Profusa may refer to:

- Acacia profusa, species of plant
- Athrips profusa, species of moth
- Gentianella profusa, species of plant
- Isanthrene profusa, species of moth
- Olsenella profusa, species of bacteria
- Phaenopsectra profusa, species of midge
