= Phaenopsectra obediens =

Scientific classification
- Domain: Eukaryota
- Kingdom: Animalia
- Phylum: Arthropoda
- Class: Insecta
- Order: Diptera
- Family: Chironomidae
- Tribe: Chironomini
- Genus: Phaenopsectra
- Species: P. obediens

Binomial name
- Phaenopsectra obediens (Johannsen, 1905)

Synonyms
- Tanytarsus obediens Johannsen, 1905

Species of fly

Phaenopsectra obediens is a species of midge in the family Chironomidae.
