= Isanthrene aterrima =

Scientific classification
- Kingdom: Animalia
- Phylum: Arthropoda
- Class: Insecta
- Order: Lepidoptera
- Superfamily: Noctuoidea
- Family: Erebidae
- Subfamily: Arctiinae
- Genus: Isanthrene
- Species: I. aterrima

Binomial name
- Isanthrene aterrima (Walker, [1865])

Synonyms
- Gymnelia aterrima Walker, [1865]; Erruca phyleis Druce, 1883

Species of moth

Isanthrene aterrima is a moth of the subfamily Arctiinae. It was described by Francis Walker in 1865. It is found in Tefé in Brazil and in Ecuador.
