= Isanthrene perbosci =

Scientific classification
- Kingdom: Animalia
- Phylum: Arthropoda
- Clade: Pancrustacea
- Class: Insecta
- Order: Lepidoptera
- Superfamily: Noctuoidea
- Family: Erebidae
- Subfamily: Arctiinae
- Genus: Isanthrene
- Species: I. perbosci

Binomial name
- Isanthrene perbosci (Guérin-Méneville, [1844])

Synonyms
- Glaucopis perbosci Guérin-Méneville, [1844]; Glaucopis pompiloides Walker, 1854

Species of moth

Isanthrene perbosci is a moth of the subfamily Arctiinae. It was described by Félix Édouard Guérin-Méneville in 1844. It is found in Mexico and Guatemala.
