= Isanthrene azia =

Scientific classification
- Domain: Eukaryota
- Kingdom: Animalia
- Phylum: Arthropoda
- Class: Insecta
- Order: Lepidoptera
- Superfamily: Noctuoidea
- Family: Erebidae
- Subfamily: Arctiinae
- Genus: Isanthrene
- Species: I. azia

Binomial name
- Isanthrene azia (H. Druce, 1884)

Synonyms
- Erruca azia H. Druce, 1884; Homoeocera azia

Species of moth

Isanthrene azia is a moth of the subfamily Arctiinae. It was described by Herbert Druce in 1884. It is found in Guatemala and Mexico.
