= Isanthrene incendiaria =

Scientific classification
- Kingdom: Animalia
- Phylum: Arthropoda
- Clade: Pancrustacea
- Class: Insecta
- Order: Lepidoptera
- Superfamily: Noctuoidea
- Family: Erebidae
- Subfamily: Arctiinae
- Genus: Isanthrene
- Species: I. incendiaria

Binomial name
- Isanthrene incendiaria (Hübner, [1813])

Synonyms
- Glaucopis incendiaria Hübner, [1813]; Isanthrene maxima Butler, 1876

Species of moth

Isanthrene incendiaria is a moth of the subfamily Arctiinae. It was described by Jacob Hübner in 1813. It is found in Rio de Janeiro, Brazil.
