= Isanthrene notipennis =

Scientific classification
- Domain: Eukaryota
- Kingdom: Animalia
- Phylum: Arthropoda
- Class: Insecta
- Order: Lepidoptera
- Superfamily: Noctuoidea
- Family: Erebidae
- Subfamily: Arctiinae
- Genus: Isanthrene
- Species: I. notipennis

Binomial name
- Isanthrene notipennis (Butler, 1876)

Synonyms
- Erruca notipennis Butler, 1876

Species of moth

Isanthrene notipennis is a moth of the subfamily Arctiinae. It was described by Arthur Gardiner Butler in 1876. It is found in the Amazon region.
