= Isanthrene championi =

Scientific classification
- Domain: Eukaryota
- Kingdom: Animalia
- Phylum: Arthropoda
- Class: Insecta
- Order: Lepidoptera
- Superfamily: Noctuoidea
- Family: Erebidae
- Subfamily: Arctiinae
- Genus: Isanthrene
- Species: I. championi

Binomial name
- Isanthrene championi H. Druce, 1884

Species of moth

Isanthrene championi is a moth of the subfamily Arctiinae. It was described by Herbert Druce in 1884. It is found in Panama.
