= Isanthrene felderi =

Scientific classification
- Domain: Eukaryota
- Kingdom: Animalia
- Phylum: Arthropoda
- Class: Insecta
- Order: Lepidoptera
- Superfamily: Noctuoidea
- Family: Erebidae
- Subfamily: Arctiinae
- Genus: Isanthrene
- Species: I. felderi

Binomial name
- Isanthrene felderi (H. Druce, 1883)

Synonyms
- Dycladia felderi H. Druce, 1883

Species of moth

Isanthrene felderi is a moth of the subfamily Arctiinae. It was described by Herbert Druce in 1883.

== Distribution ==
It is found in Mexico, Guatemala, Costa Rica and Ecuador.
