= Phaenopsectra punctipes =

Scientific classification
- Domain: Eukaryota
- Kingdom: Animalia
- Phylum: Arthropoda
- Class: Insecta
- Order: Diptera
- Family: Chironomidae
- Tribe: Chironomini
- Genus: Phaenopsectra
- Species: P. punctipes

Binomial name
- Phaenopsectra punctipes (Wiedemann, 1817)

Synonyms
- Chironomus punctipes Wiedemann, 1817

Species of fly

Phaenopsectra punctipes is a species of midge in the family Chironomidae. It is found in Europe.
