= Isanthrene pertyi =

Scientific classification
- Domain: Eukaryota
- Kingdom: Animalia
- Phylum: Arthropoda
- Class: Insecta
- Order: Lepidoptera
- Superfamily: Noctuoidea
- Family: Erebidae
- Subfamily: Arctiinae
- Genus: Isanthrene
- Species: I. pertyi

Binomial name
- Isanthrene pertyi (Herrich-Schäffer, [1854])

Synonyms
- Laemocharis pertyi Herrich-Schäffer, [1854]

Species of moth

Isanthrene pertyi is a moth of the subfamily Arctiinae. It was described by Gottlieb August Wilhelm Herrich-Schäffer in 1854. It is found in Espírito Santo, Brazil.
