= Isanthrene ustrina =

Scientific classification
- Kingdom: Animalia
- Phylum: Arthropoda
- Clade: Pancrustacea
- Class: Insecta
- Order: Lepidoptera
- Superfamily: Noctuoidea
- Family: Erebidae
- Subfamily: Arctiinae
- Genus: Isanthrene
- Species: I. ustrina

Binomial name
- Isanthrene ustrina Hübner, 1824

Species of moth

Isanthrene ustrina is a moth of the subfamily Arctiinae. It was described by Jacob Hübner in 1824. It is found on Cuba and in Brazil.
