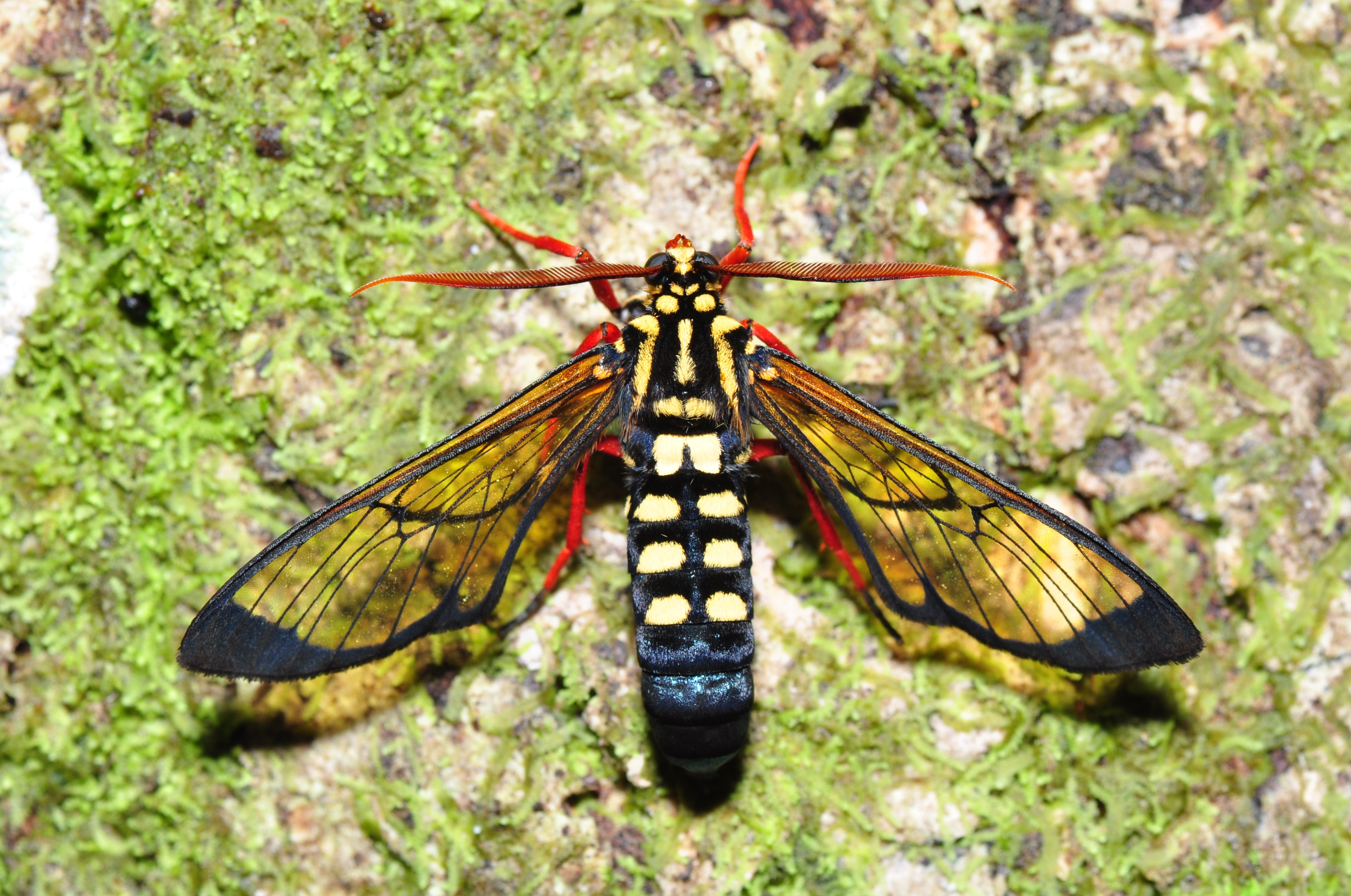

Scientific classification
- Kingdom: Animalia
- Phylum: Arthropoda
- Clade: Pancrustacea
- Class: Insecta
- Order: Lepidoptera
- Superfamily: Noctuoidea
- Family: Erebidae
- Subfamily: Arctiinae
- Genus: Isanthrene
- Species: I. crabroniformis

Binomial name
- Isanthrene crabroniformis Staudinger, 1876

= Isanthrene crabroniformis =

Species of moth

Isanthrene crabroniformis is a moth of the subfamily Arctiinae. It was described by Otto Staudinger in 1876. It is found in Panama and Colombia.
