= Isanthrene pentagona =

Scientific classification
- Domain: Eukaryota
- Kingdom: Animalia
- Phylum: Arthropoda
- Class: Insecta
- Order: Lepidoptera
- Superfamily: Noctuoidea
- Family: Erebidae
- Subfamily: Arctiinae
- Genus: Isanthrene
- Species: I. pentagona

Binomial name
- Isanthrene pentagona Schaus, 1898

Species of moth

Isanthrene pentagona is a moth of the subfamily Arctiinae. It was described by William Schaus in 1898. It is found in Peru.
