= Isanthrene porphyria =

Scientific classification
- Kingdom: Animalia
- Phylum: Arthropoda
- Class: Insecta
- Order: Lepidoptera
- Superfamily: Noctuoidea
- Family: Erebidae
- Subfamily: Arctiinae
- Genus: Isanthrene
- Species: I. porphyria

Binomial name
- Isanthrene porphyria (Walker, 1854)

Synonyms
- Glaucopis porphyria Walker, 1854; Laemocharis machile Herrich-Schäffer, [1854]

Species of moth

Isanthrene porphyria is a moth of the subfamily Arctiinae. It was described by Francis Walker in 1854. It is found in Suriname and Brazil (Amazon, Ega, Para).
