= Isanthrene minor =

Scientific classification
- Kingdom: Animalia
- Phylum: Arthropoda
- Clade: Pancrustacea
- Class: Insecta
- Order: Lepidoptera
- Superfamily: Noctuoidea
- Family: Erebidae
- Subfamily: Arctiinae
- Genus: Isanthrene
- Species: I. minor

Binomial name
- Isanthrene minor (Butler, 1876)

Synonyms
- Dycladia minor Butler, 1876

Species of moth

Isanthrene minor is a moth of the subfamily Arctiinae. It was described by Arthur Gardiner Butler in 1876. It is found in Brazil.
