= Isanthrene basifera =

Scientific classification
- Kingdom: Animalia
- Phylum: Arthropoda
- Class: Insecta
- Order: Lepidoptera
- Superfamily: Noctuoidea
- Family: Erebidae
- Subfamily: Arctiinae
- Genus: Isanthrene
- Species: I. basifera

Binomial name
- Isanthrene basifera Walker, [1865]

Synonyms
- Isanthrene grenadensis Butler, 1876

Species of moth

Isanthrene basifera is a moth of the subfamily Arctiinae. It was described by Francis Walker in 1865. It is found in Colombia.
