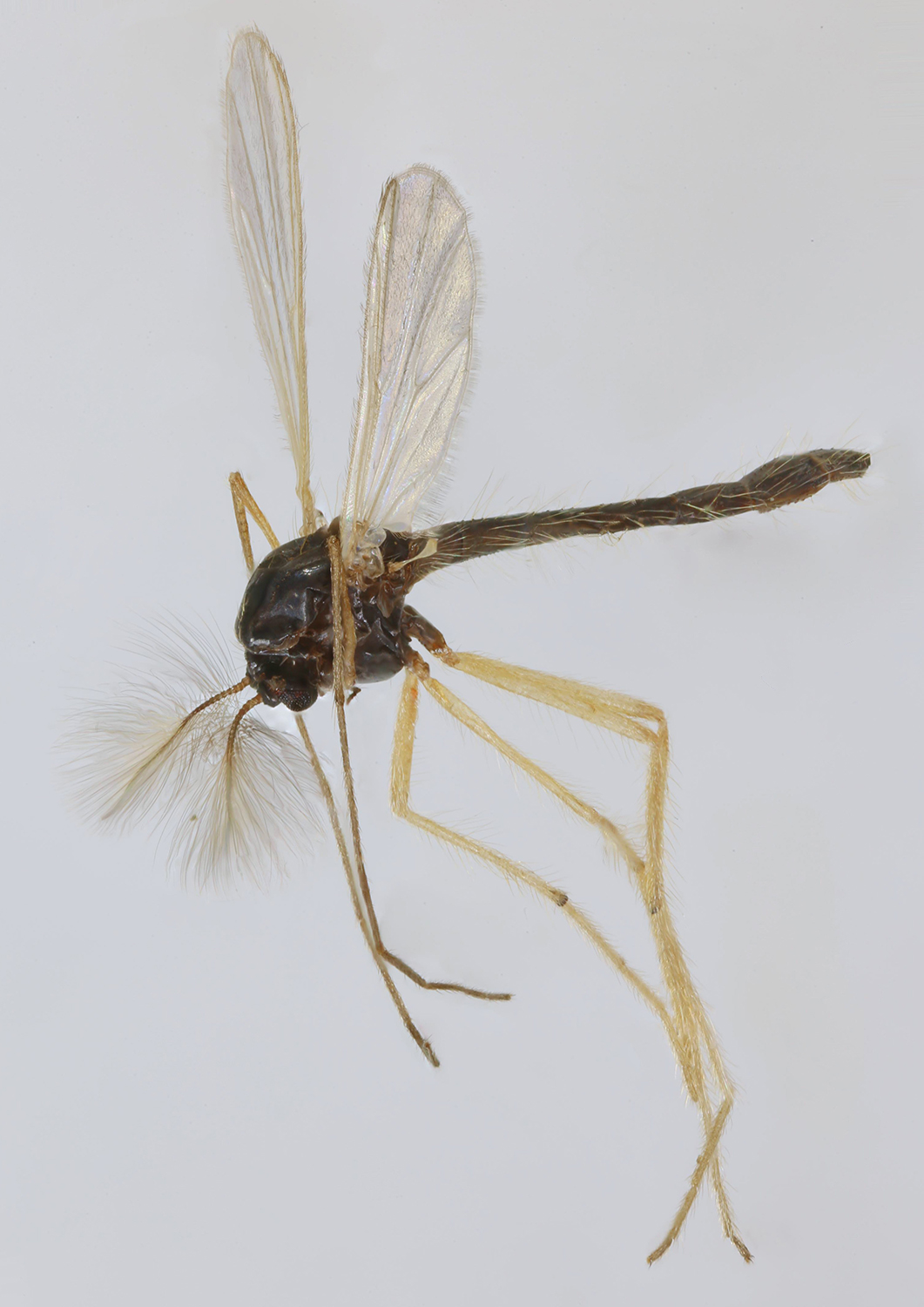
- In North Wales

Scientific classification
- Kingdom: Animalia
- Phylum: Arthropoda
- Class: Insecta
- Order: Diptera
- Family: Chironomidae
- Genus: Phaenopsectra
- Species: P. flavipes

Binomial name
- Phaenopsectra flavipes (Meigen, 1818)

= Phaenopsectra flavipes =

Species of fly

Phaenopsectra flavipes is a species of fly in the family Chironomidae. It is found in the Palearctic.
