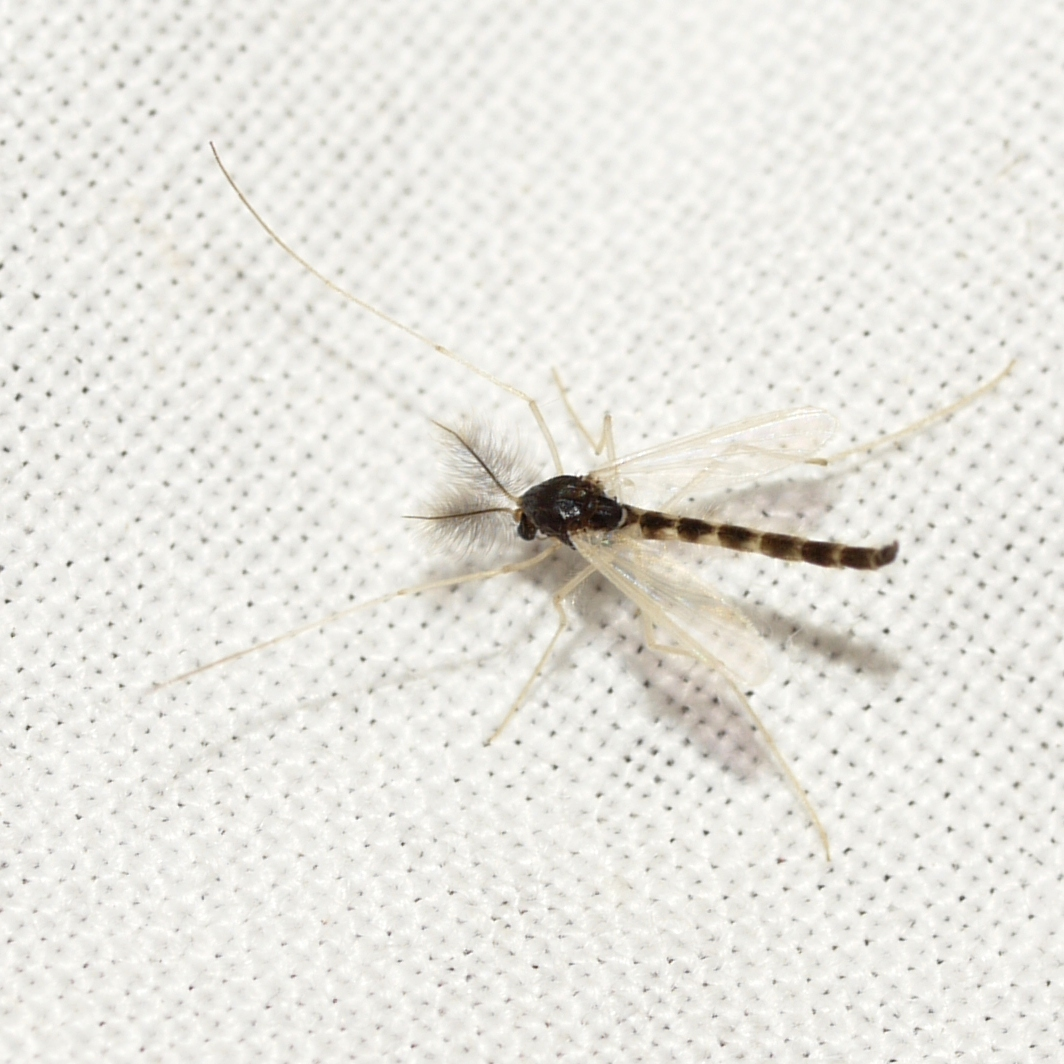
- Phaenopsectra obediens, Wisconsin

Scientific classification
- Kingdom: Animalia
- Phylum: Arthropoda
- Clade: Pancrustacea
- Class: Insecta
- Order: Diptera
- Family: Chironomidae
- Subfamily: Chironominae
- Tribe: Chironomini
- Genus: Phaenopsectra; Kieffer, 1921

Subgenera
- Pentapedilum; Phaenopsectra Kieffer, 1921

Synonyms
- Lenzia Kieffer, 1922

= Phaenopsectra =

Genus of non-biting midges

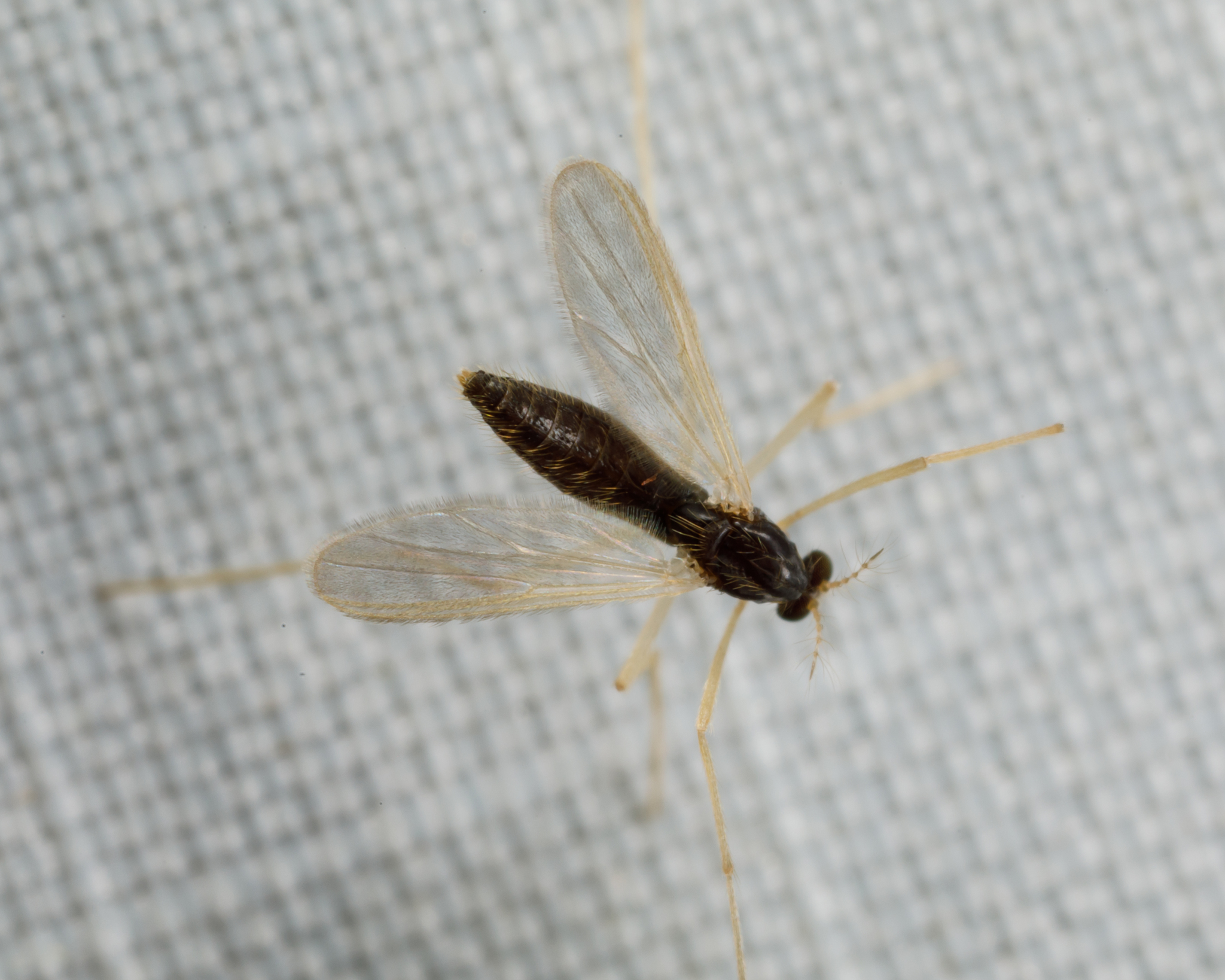
Phaenopsectra flavipes, Delaware

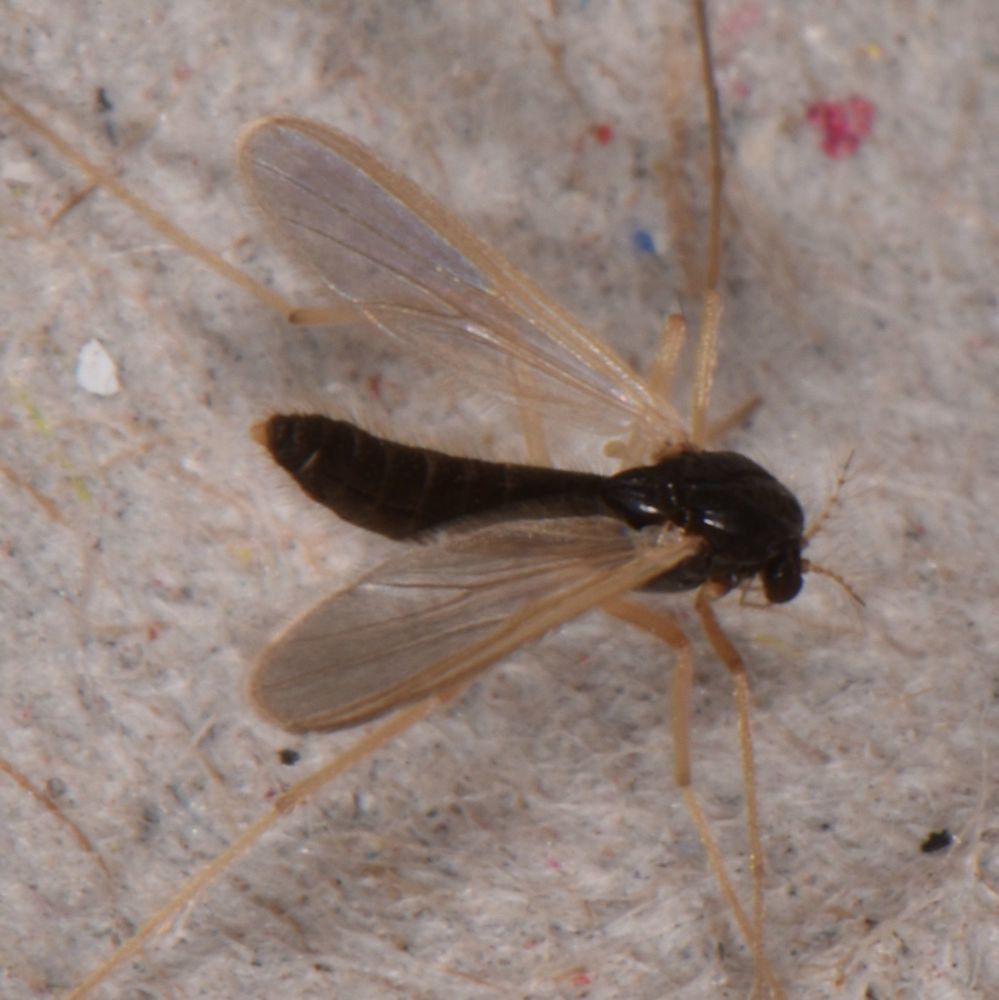
Phaenopsectra dyari, Canada

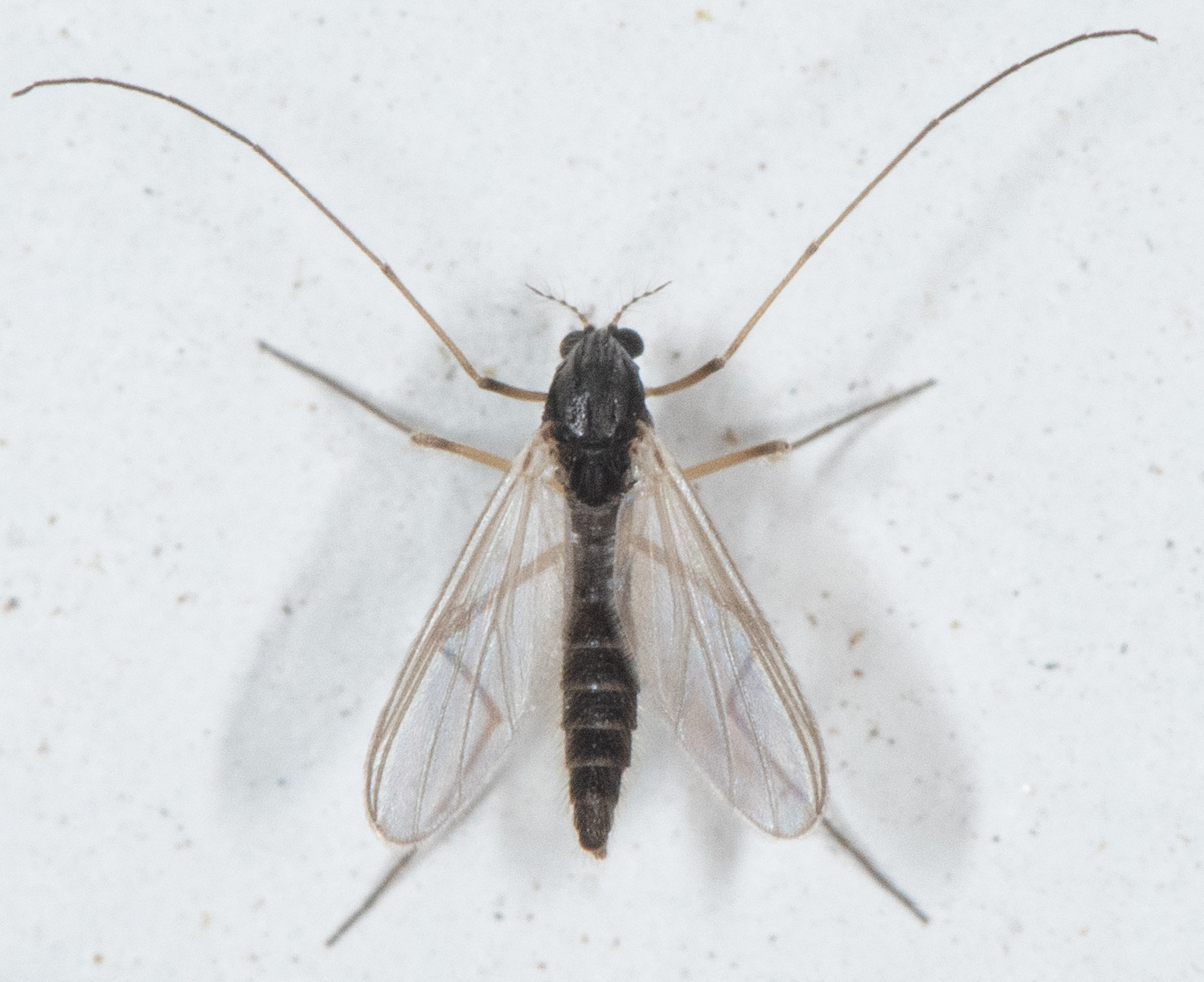
Phaenopsectra profusa, California

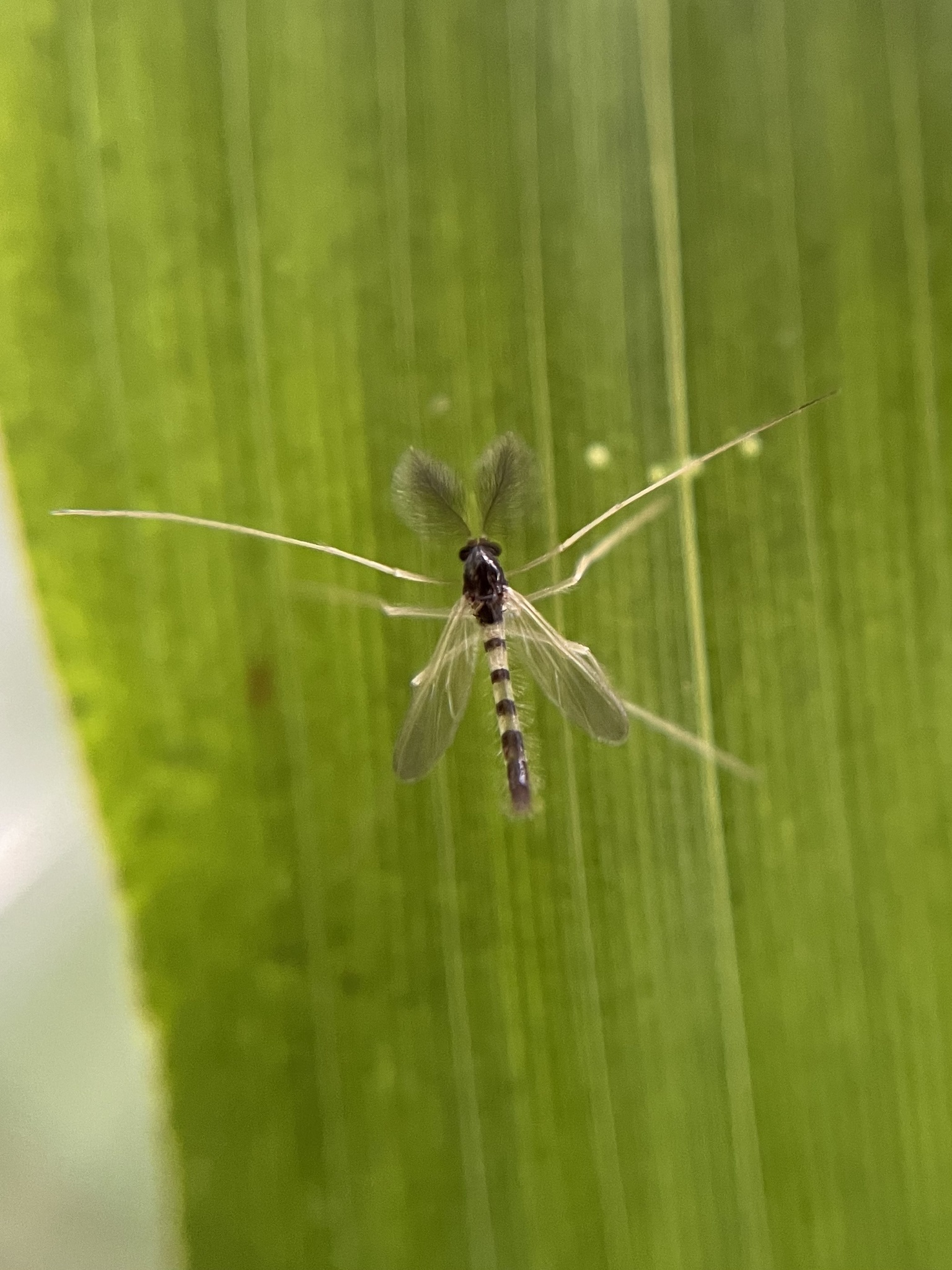
Phaenopsectra vittata, Georgia

Phaenopsectra is a genus of non-biting midges in the family Chironomidae. There are about 19 described species in Phaenopsectra, found in Europe, Asia, and the Americas.

== Species ==
These 19 species belong to the genus Phaenopsectra:

- Phaenopsectra albiventris (Kieffer, 1922)
- Phaenopsectra connectens (Kieffer & Thienemann, 1908)
- Phaenopsectra dyari (Townes, 1945)
- Phaenopsectra ellipsoidalis (Kieffer, 1911)
- Phaenopsectra flavipes (Meigen, 1818)
- Phaenopsectra gressitti Tokunaga, 1964
- Phaenopsectra incompta (Zetterstedt, 1838)
- Phaenopsectra kizakiensis (Tokunaga, 1940)
- Phaenopsectra leucolabis (Kieffer)
- Phaenopsectra magellanica (Edwards, 1931)
- Phaenopsectra mortensoni Grodhaus, 1987
- Phaenopsectra obediens (Johannsen, 1905)
- Phaenopsectra pilicellata Grodhaus, 1976
- Phaenopsectra profusa (Townes, 1945)
- Phaenopsectra punctipes (Wiedemann, 1817)
- Phaenopsectra superatum Kieffer, 1922
- Phaenopsectra tamahamurai (Sasa, 1983)
- Phaenopsectra vittata (Townes, 1945)
- † Phaenopsectra meunieri Seredszus & Wichard, 2007
