= Isanthrene varia =

Scientific classification
- Kingdom: Animalia
- Phylum: Arthropoda
- Class: Insecta
- Order: Lepidoptera
- Superfamily: Noctuoidea
- Family: Erebidae
- Subfamily: Arctiinae
- Genus: Isanthrene
- Species: I. varia

Binomial name
- Isanthrene varia (Walker, 1854)

Synonyms
- Glaucopis varia Walker, 1854

Species of moth

Isanthrene varia is a moth of the subfamily Arctiinae. It was described by Francis Walker in 1854. It is found in Panama and Pará, Brazil.
