= Isanthrene echemon =

Scientific classification
- Kingdom: Animalia
- Phylum: Arthropoda
- Clade: Pancrustacea
- Class: Insecta
- Order: Lepidoptera
- Superfamily: Noctuoidea
- Family: Erebidae
- Subfamily: Arctiinae
- Genus: Isanthrene
- Species: I. echemon

Binomial name
- Isanthrene echemon H. Druce, 1884

Species of moth

Isanthrene echemon is a moth of the subfamily Arctiinae. It was described by Herbert Druce in 1884. It is found throughout Central America, particularly in Guatemala and Mexico.
