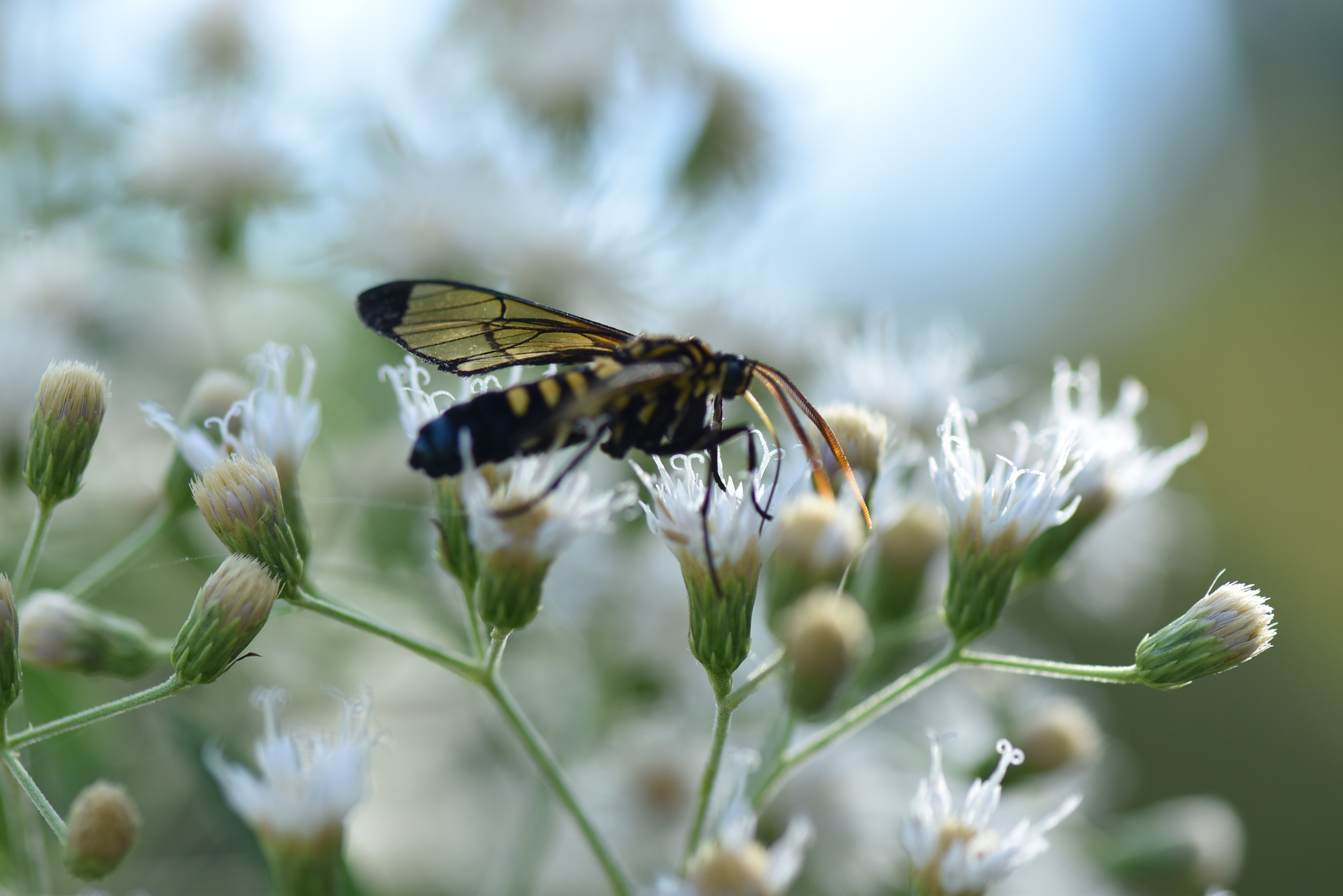

Scientific classification
- Domain: Eukaryota
- Kingdom: Animalia
- Phylum: Arthropoda
- Class: Insecta
- Order: Lepidoptera
- Superfamily: Noctuoidea
- Family: Erebidae
- Subfamily: Arctiinae
- Genus: Isanthrene
- Species: I. melas

Binomial name
- Isanthrene melas (Cramer, [1775])

Synonyms
- Sphinx melas Cramer, [1775]; Zygaena flavicornis Fabricius, 1787; Glaucopis vespoides Walker, 1854

= Isanthrene melas =

Species of moth

Isanthrene melas is a moth of the subfamily Arctiinae. It was described by Pieter Cramer in 1775. It is found in Brazil.
