= Isanthrene pyrocera =

Scientific classification
- Kingdom: Animalia
- Phylum: Arthropoda
- Class: Insecta
- Order: Lepidoptera
- Superfamily: Noctuoidea
- Family: Erebidae
- Subfamily: Arctiinae
- Genus: Isanthrene
- Species: I. pyrocera

Binomial name
- Isanthrene pyrocera Hampson, 1898

Species of moth

Isanthrene pyrocera is a moth of the subfamily Arctiinae. It was described by George Hampson in 1898. It is found in Mexico.
