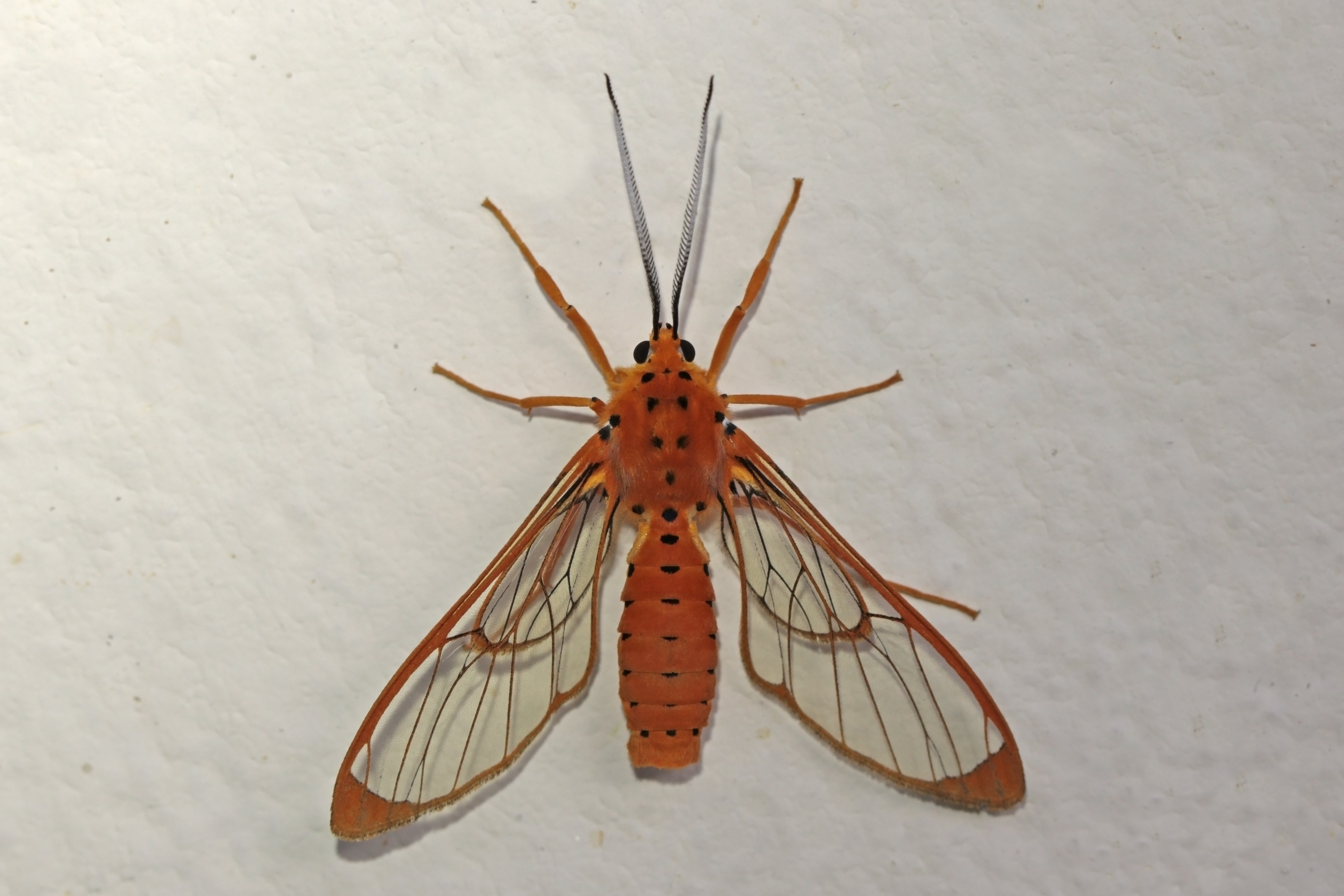
- Isanthrene monticola Mount Totumas cloud forest, Panama

Scientific classification
- Kingdom: Animalia
- Phylum: Arthropoda
- Clade: Pancrustacea
- Class: Insecta
- Order: Lepidoptera
- Superfamily: Noctuoidea
- Family: Erebidae
- Subfamily: Arctiinae
- Subtribe: Euchromiina
- Genus: Isanthrene; Hübner, [1819]

Synonyms
- Laemocharis Herrich-Schäffer, [1854]

= Isanthrene =

Genus of moths

Isanthrene is a genus of moths in the subfamily Arctiinae. The genus was erected by Jacob Hübner in 1819.

== Species ==
- Isanthrene aterrima (Walker, [1865])
- Isanthrene azia (Druce, 1884)
- Isanthrene basifera Walker, [1865]
- Isanthrene championi Druce, 1884
- Isanthrene crabroniformis Staudinger, 1876
- Isanthrene echemon Druce, 1884
- Isanthrene felderi (Druce, 1883)
- Isanthrene incendiaria (Hübner, [1813])
- Isanthrene melas (Cramer, [1775])
- Isanthrene minor (Butler, 1876)
- Isanthrene monticola (Schaus, 1911)
- Isanthrene notipennis (Butler, 1876)
- Isanthrene pelor (Druce, 1897)
- Isanthrene pentagona Schaus, 1898
- Isanthrene perbosci (Guérin-Méneville, [1844])
- Isanthrene pertyi (Herrich-Schäffer, [1854])
- Isanthrene porphyria (Walker, 1854)
- Isanthrene profusa Hampson, 1898
- Isanthrene pyrocera Hampson, 1898
- Isanthrene thyestes Druce, 1883
- Isanthrene ustrina Hübner, 1824
- Isanthrene varia (Walker, 1854)
- Isanthrene vespiformis (Butler, 1876)
