= Isanthrene pelor =

Scientific classification
- Domain: Eukaryota
- Kingdom: Animalia
- Phylum: Arthropoda
- Class: Insecta
- Order: Lepidoptera
- Superfamily: Noctuoidea
- Family: Erebidae
- Subfamily: Arctiinae
- Genus: Isanthrene
- Species: I. pelor

Binomial name
- Isanthrene pelor (H. Druce, 1897)

Synonyms
- Homoeocera pelor H. Druce, 1897

Species of moth

Isanthrene pelor is a moth of the subfamily Arctiinae. It was described by Herbert Druce in 1897. It is found in Ecuador.
