= Phaenopsectra profusa =

Scientific classification
- Kingdom: Animalia
- Phylum: Arthropoda
- Clade: Pancrustacea
- Class: Insecta
- Order: Diptera
- Family: Chironomidae
- Tribe: Chironomini
- Genus: Phaenopsectra
- Species: P. profusa

Binomial name
- Phaenopsectra profusa (Townes, 1945)

Synonyms
- Tanytarsus profusa Townes, 1945

Species of fly

Phaenopsectra profusa is a species of midge in the family Chironomidae.
