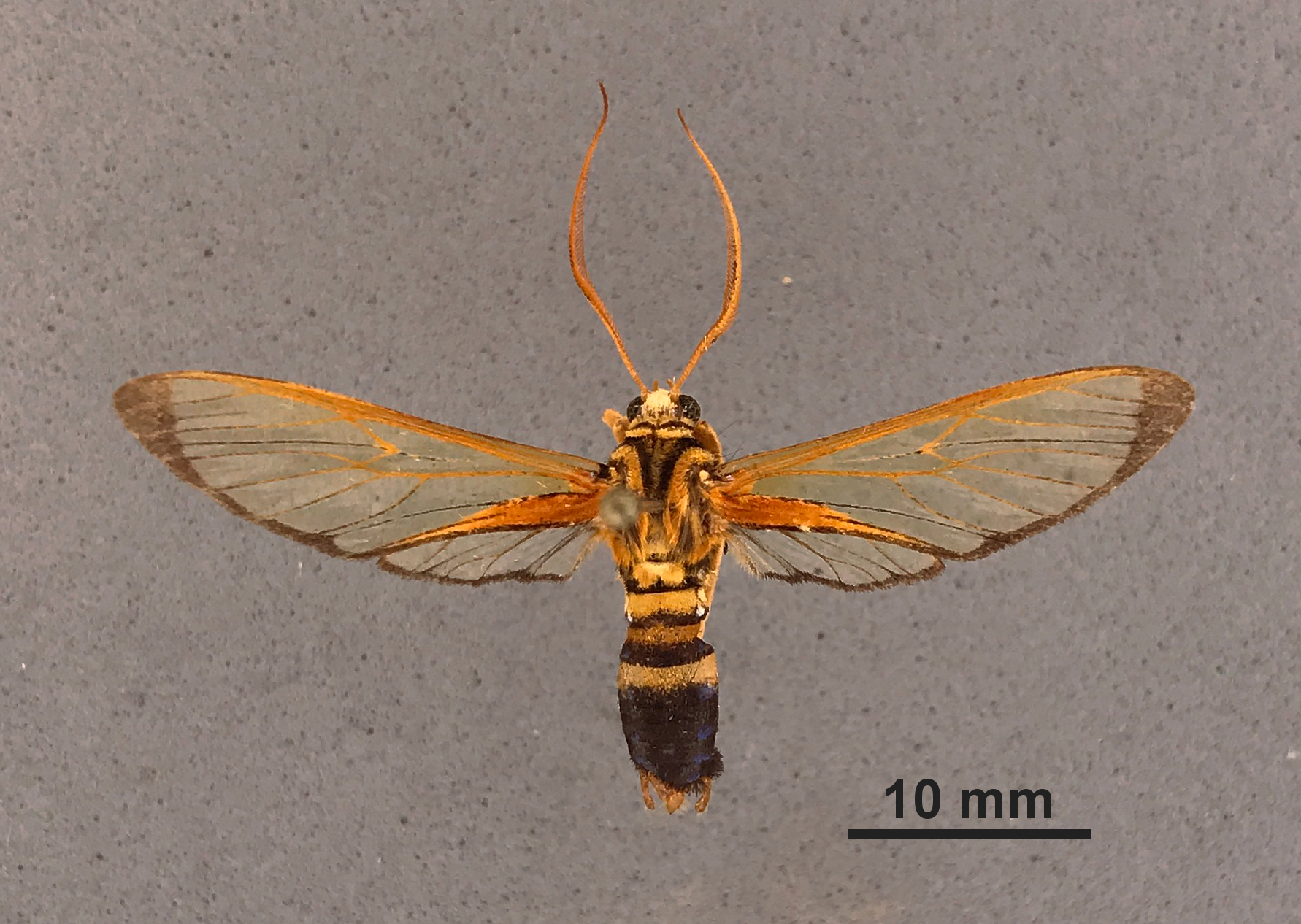
- Isanthrene profusa

Scientific classification
- Kingdom: Animalia
- Phylum: Arthropoda
- Clade: Pancrustacea
- Class: Insecta
- Order: Lepidoptera
- Superfamily: Noctuoidea
- Family: Erebidae
- Subfamily: Arctiinae
- Genus: Isanthrene
- Species: I. profusa

Binomial name
- Isanthrene profusa Hampson, 1898

= Isanthrene profusa =

Species of moth

Isanthrene profusa is a moth of the subfamily Arctiinae. It was described by George Hampson in 1898. It is found in Tefé, Pará and São Paulo in Brazil.
