= Acacia profusa =

Scientific classification
- Kingdom: Plantae
- Clade: Tracheophytes
- Clade: Angiosperms
- Clade: Eudicots
- Clade: Rosids
- Order: Fabales
- Family: Fabaceae
- Subfamily: Caesalpinioideae
- Clade: Mimosoid clade
- Genus: Acacia
- Species: A. profusa

Binomial name
- Acacia profusa Maslin
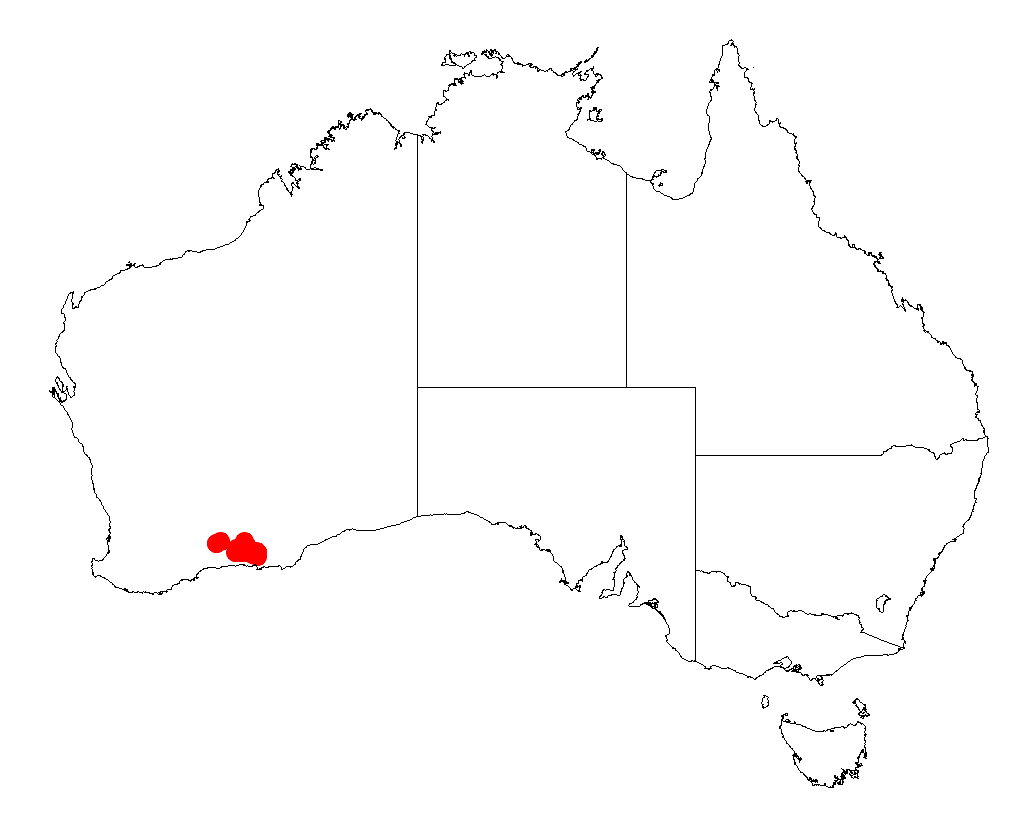
- Occurrence data from AVH

Species of legume

Acacia profusa is a shrub of the genus Acacia and the subgenus Phyllodineae that is endemic to south western Australia.

== Description ==
The erect shrub typically grows to a height of 0.3 to 0.9 metres (1 to 3 ft) and can have a compact to open habit. It has glabrous and occasionally resinous. Like many species of Acacia it has phyllodes rather than true leaves. The crowded and evergreen phyllodes are erect or ascending. The grey-green phyllodes have a linear shape and can be straight to slightly incurved with a length of 5 to 20 mm (0.20 to 0.79 in) and a width of 1 to 1.5 mm (0.039 to 0.059 in) with three main nerves and an immersed to barely evident midrib. It blooms from September to October and produces yellow flowers. The rudimentary inflorescences occur as singly or in pairs along a raceme with an axis length of 0.5 to 1 mm (0.020 to 0.039 in) and have spherical flower-heads that have a diameter of 4.5 to 5 mm (0.18 to 0.20 in) containing 10 to 17 golden coloured flowers. Following flowering glabrous and chartaceous seed pods form that have a narrowly oblong to oblong shape with a length of up to 25 mm (0.98 in) and a width of 10 to 12 mm (0.39 to 0.47 in). The seeds insode are arranged transversely within the pod and have a broadly elliptic shape with a length of around 0.5 mm (0.020 in).

== Taxonomy ==
The species was first formally described by the botanist Bruce Maslin in 1999 as a part of the work Acacia miscellany. The taxonomy of fifty-five species of Acacia, primarily Western Australian, in section Phyllodineae. as published in the journal Nuytsia. It was reclassified as Racosperma profusum by Leslie Pedley in 2003 then transferred back to genus Acacia in 2006.

== Distribution ==
It is native to an area in the Wheatbelt and Goldfields-Esperance region of Western Australia extending from around Lake Grace in the north west to around Esperance in the south east where it is commonly situated on flats growing in clay to loamy or sandy-loamy soils. The bulk of the population is located from around Frank Hann National Park and Peak Eleonora to the south of Norseman in the north to around Mount Ridley to the north of Esperance in the south east where it is a part of open dwarf shrub, shrub mallee or low heath communities.

== See also ==
- List of Acacia species
