= Acacia rhamphophylla =

Kundip wattle

Conservation status
- Endangered (EPBC Act)

Scientific classification
- Kingdom: Plantae
- Clade: Tracheophytes
- Clade: Angiosperms
- Clade: Eudicots
- Clade: Rosids
- Order: Fabales
- Family: Fabaceae
- Subfamily: Caesalpinioideae
- Clade: Mimosoid clade
- Genus: Acacia
- Species: A. rhamphophylla

Binomial name
- Acacia rhamphophylla Maslin

Species of legume

Acacia rhamphophylla, commonly known as Kundip wattle, is a shrub of the genus Acacia and the subgenus Phyllodineae that is endemic to a small area in south western Australia. It is listed as an endangered species according to the Environment Protection and Biodiversity Conservation Act 1999.

== Description ==
The low spreading shrub typically grows to a height of 0.2 to 0.4 metres (1 to 1 ft) and a width of 0.4 to 1.1 m (1 ft 4 in to 3 ft 7 in). It has hairy, slender, dark grey coloured branchlets with setaceous recurved stipules that are 5 to 7 mm (0.20 to 0.28 in) in length. Like most species of Acacia it has phyllodes rather than true leaves. The glabrous, dark green phyllodes are crowded on the branchlets. The linear phyllodes have a length of 11 to 17 mm (0.43 to 0.67 in) and a width of 1 to 1.5 mm (0.039 to 0.059 in) are narrowed at the base and with a raised and prominent midrib. It blooms from August to September and produces yellow flowers.

== Taxonomy ==
It is known to be closely related to Acacia laricina and Acacia cedroides and is also closely allied to Acacia pusilla.

== Distribution ==
It is native to an area in the Goldfields-Esperance region of Western Australia where it is often situated on the higher areas of low ranges growing in rocky sandy clay soils. as part of open mallee scrub communities. Its limited range in the Ravensthorpe Range where it is found in an area of on vacant crown land, some of which is a mining lease. In 1992, there are known to be over 100 individual plants.

== See also ==
- List of Acacia species
