= Acacia pusilla =

Scientific classification
- Kingdom: Plantae
- Clade: Tracheophytes
- Clade: Angiosperms
- Clade: Eudicots
- Clade: Rosids
- Order: Fabales
- Family: Fabaceae
- Subfamily: Caesalpinioideae
- Clade: Mimosoid clade
- Genus: Acacia
- Species: A. pusilla

Binomial name
- Acacia pusilla Maslin
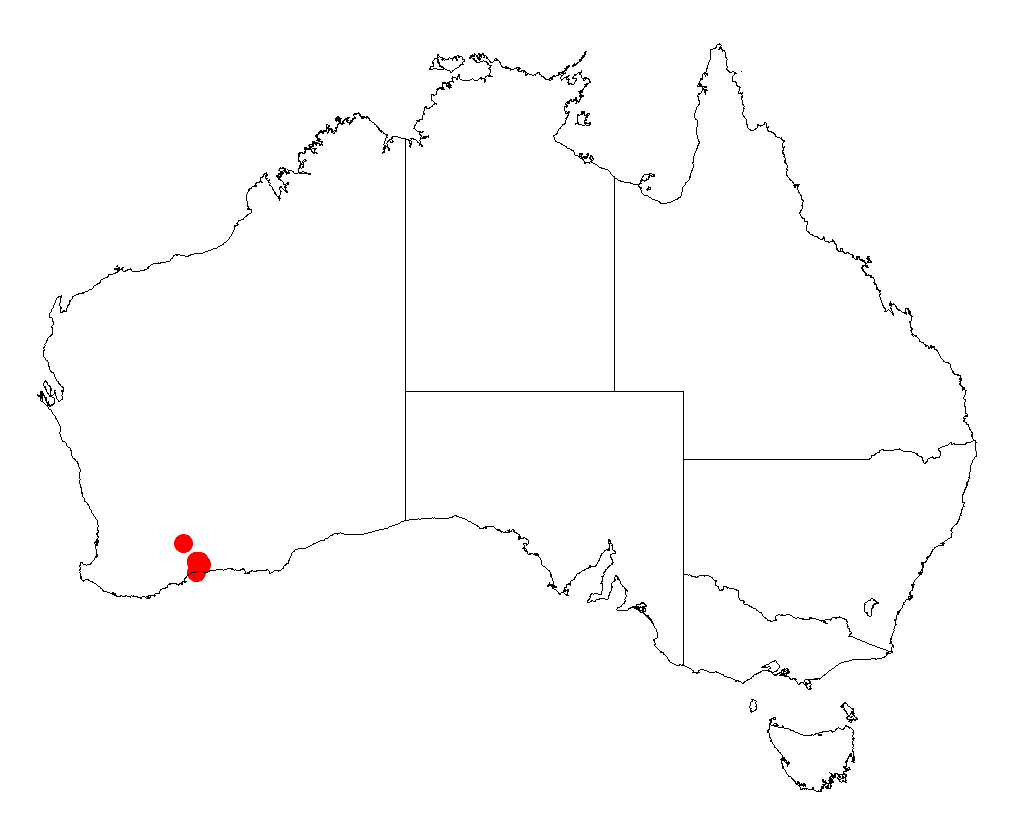
- Occurrence data from AVH

Species of legume

Acacia pusilla is a shrub of the genus Acacia and the subgenus Phyllodineae the is endemic to south western Australia.

== Description ==
The dome shaped shrub typically grows to a height of 0.1 to 0.3 metres (0.3 to 1.0 ft). It has decumbent and hairy branchlets with persistent, setaceous and recurved stipules with a length of 1.5 to 3 mm (0.059 to 0.118 in). Like most species of Acacia it has phyllodes rather than true leaves. The crowded and grey-green and glabrous phyllodes are found on raised stem-projections and are patent to erect. The flat and linear phyllodes have a length of 5 to 13 mm (0.20 to 0.51 in) and a width of 1 mm (0.039 in) and are narrowed toward the base. It blooms from September to October and produces yellow flowers.

== Taxonomy ==
The species was first formally described by the botanist Bruce Maslin in 1999 as part of the work The taxonomy of fifty-five species of Acacia, primarily Western Australian, in section Phyllodineae as published in the journal Nuytsia. It was reclassified as Racosperma pusillum by Leslie Pedley in 2003 and transferred back to genus Acacia in 2014. It is closely related to Acacia rhamphophylla and resembles Acacia lachnophylla.

== Distribution ==
It is native to an area along the south coast in the Goldfields-Esperance region of Western Australia from around Esperance in the west to around Israelite Bay in the east where it is found around the margins of salt lakes and on sandplains growing in sandy-clay soils often around limestone. The bulk of the population is found in the Ravensthorpe Range situated on the lower slopes often around watercourses as a part of dense mallee shrub and woodland communities.

== See also ==
- List of Acacia species
