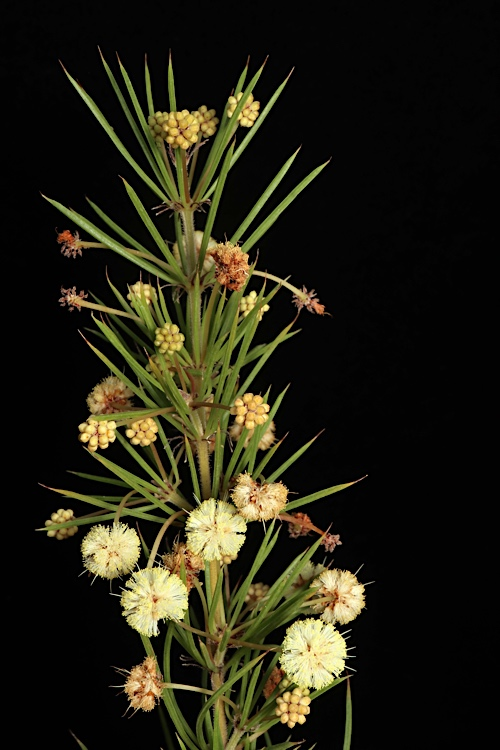
- In the Australian National Botanic Gardens

Scientific classification
- Kingdom: Plantae
- Clade: Tracheophytes
- Clade: Angiosperms
- Clade: Eudicots
- Clade: Rosids
- Order: Fabales
- Family: Fabaceae
- Subfamily: Caesalpinioideae
- Clade: Mimosoid clade
- Genus: Acacia
- Species: A. cedroides

Binomial name
- Acacia cedroides Benth.
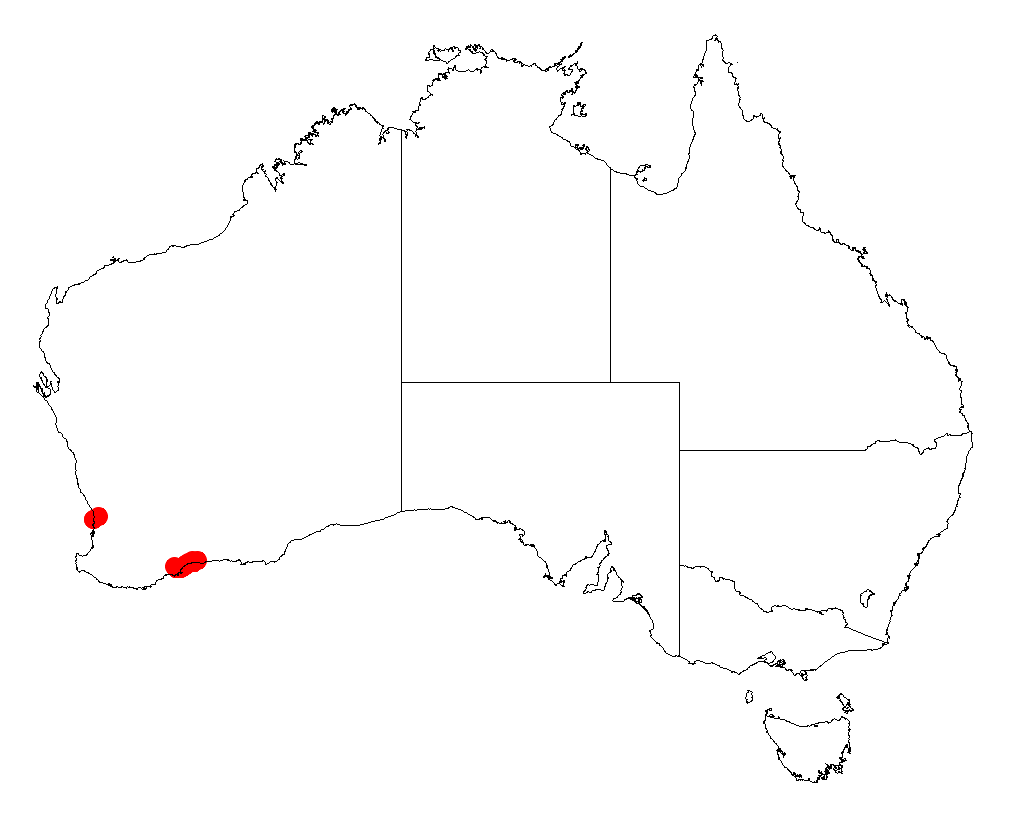
- Occurrence data from AVH

Synonyms
- Racosperma cedroides (Benth.) Pedley

= Acacia cedroides =

Species of legume

Acacia cedroides is a species of flowering plant in the family Fabaceae and is endemic to the Fitzgerald River National Park in the southwest of Western Australia. It is a dense, prickly shrub with many ribbed branchlets, sharply pointed phyllodes arranged in whorls, spherical heads of cream-coloured to pale yellow flowers, and more or less terete, thinly crust-like to leathery pods.

== Description ==
Acacia cedroides is a dense, prickly shrub typically that grows to a height of 0.3 to 1 metre (1 to 3 ft) and has finely ribbed, striated, hairy branchlets. Its phyllodes are arranged in whorls, each phyllode 10–30 mm (0.39–1.18 in) long and 0.8–1.5 mm (0.031–0.059 in) wide, usually glabrous and sharply pointed. The flowers are borne in spherical heads on a peduncle 7–13 mm (0.28–0.51 in) long, each head with 15 to 25 cream-coloured to pale yellow flowers. Flowering occurs from August to November and the pods are more or less terete, thinly crusty to leathery, up to 50 mm (2.0 in) long and 2.5–3.5 mm (0.098–0.138 in) wide, reddish-brown and coarsely striated containing oblong, light greyish-brown seeds 4–5 mm (0.16–0.20 in) long with a conical aril.

== Taxonomy ==
Acacia cedroides was first formally described in 1855 by George Bentham in the journal Linnaea from specimens collected by James Drummond between the Swan River and King George Sound. The specific epithet (cedroides) means 'cedar tree-like'.

== Distribution and habitat ==
This species of wattle grows on quartzite hills in heath or open shrubland in the Fitzgerald River National Park in the Esperance Plains bioregion.

== Conservation status ==
Acacia cedroides is listed as "not threatened" by the Government of Western Australia Department of Biodiversity, Conservation and Attractions.

== See also ==
- List of Acacia species
