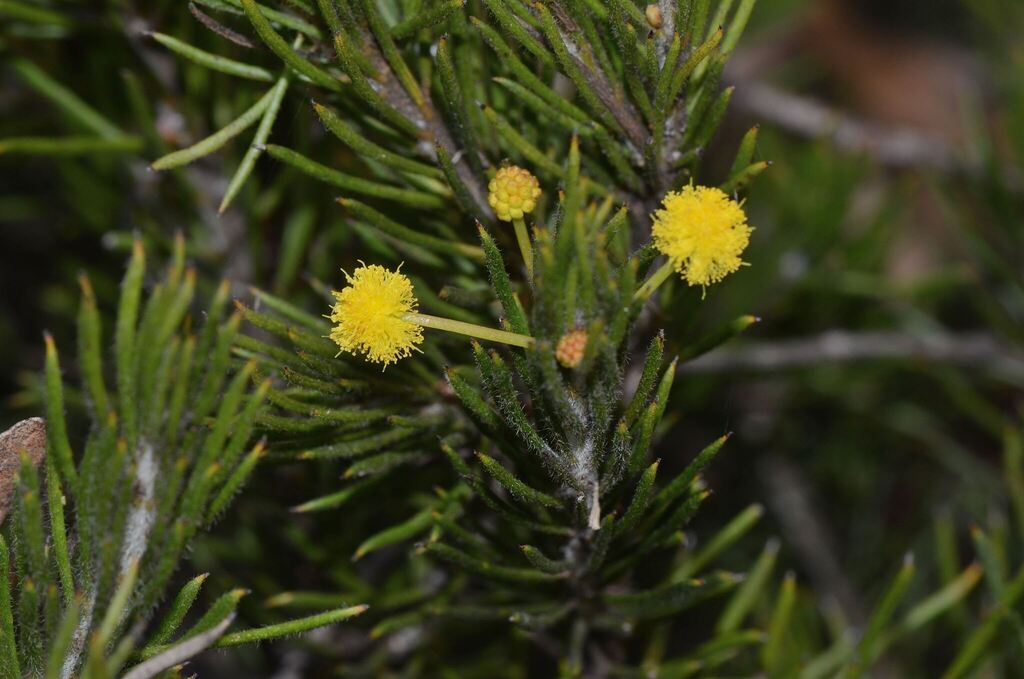
- Near Ravensthorpe

Scientific classification
- Kingdom: Plantae
- Clade: Embryophytes
- Clade: Tracheophytes
- Clade: Spermatophytes
- Clade: Angiosperms
- Clade: Eudicots
- Clade: Rosids
- Order: Fabales
- Family: Fabaceae
- Subfamily: Caesalpinioideae
- Clade: Mimosoid clade
- Genus: Acacia
- Species: A. lachnophylla

Binomial name
- Acacia lachnophylla F.Muell.
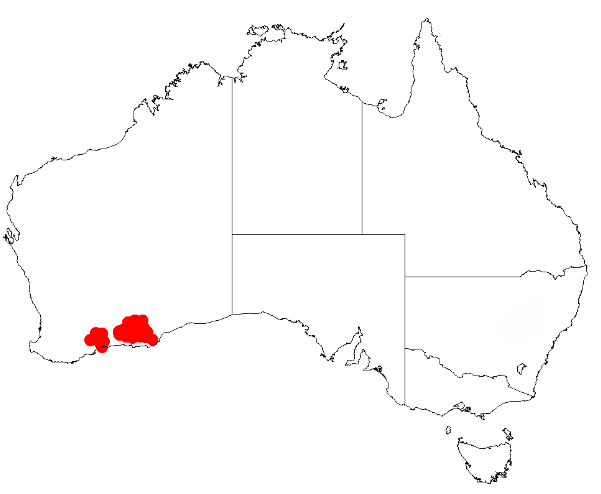
- Occurrence data from AVH

Synonyms
- Acacia cometes C.R.P.Andrews; Racosperma lachnophyllum (F.Muell.) Pedley

= Acacia lachnophylla =

Species of legume

Acacia lachnophylla is a species of flowering plant in the family Fabaceae and is endemic to a small area in the south-west of Western Australia. It is a prostrate, spreading or domed shrub with densely hairy branchlets, linear, straight to slightly curved, subterete to flat phyllodes, spherical heads of golden yellow flowers and linear to ring-shaped or coiled black pods.

== Description ==
Acacia lachnophylla is a prostrate, spreading or domed shrub that typically grows to a height of 0.1–1.0 m (3.9 in – 3 ft 3.4 in) and has densely hairy branchlets. Its phyllodes are sometimes crowded, straight to slightly curved, subterete to flat, 10–20 mm (0.39–0.79 in) long and 0.7–1.0 mm (0.028–0.039 in) wide. The phyllodes are usually hairy with one vein on each side, no prominent midrib and an inconspicuous gland usually 4–12 mm (0.16–0.47 in) above the pulvinus. The flowers are usually borne in two spherical heads in axils on glabrous peduncles 7–17 mm (0.28–0.67 in) long, each head with 20 to 32 golden yellow flowers. Flowering occurs from August to October, and the pods are linear to ring-shaped or coiled, 2.0–2.5 mm (0.079–0.098 in) wide, black, glabrous and crusty to leathery. The seeds are oblong to broadly elliptic, 2.0–2.5 mm (0.079–0.098 in) long and mottled, with a thick aril.

== Taxonomy ==
Acacia lachnophylla was first formally described in 1882 by Ferdinand von Mueller in his Southern Science Record from specimens collected "between Esperance-Bay and Fraser's Range" by Andrew Dempster (1843–1909). The specific epithet (lachnophylla) means 'soft wool-leaved'.

== Distribution and habitat ==
This species of wattle grows in clay loam and sandy or gravelly soils on undulating plains, flats and low rises between Peak Charles National Park, Norseman and Grass Patch and around Ravensthorpe in the Coolgardie, Esperance Plains and Mallee bioregions of south-western Western Australia.

== Conservation status ==
Acacia lachnophylla is listed as 'not threatened' by the Government of Western Australia Department of Parks and Wildlife.

== See also ==
- List of Acacia species
