= Acacia laricina =

- Foliage and flower buds

Scientific classification
- Kingdom: Plantae
- Clade: Tracheophytes
- Clade: Angiosperms
- Clade: Eudicots
- Clade: Rosids
- Order: Fabales
- Family: Fabaceae
- Subfamily: Caesalpinioideae
- Clade: Mimosoid clade
- Genus: Acacia
- Species: A. laricina

Binomial name
- Acacia laricina Meisn.
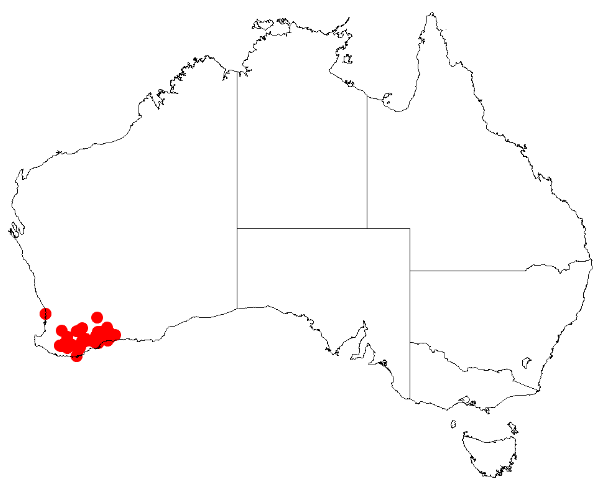
- Acacia laricina occurrence data from Australasian Virtual Herbarium

Synonyms
- Racosperma laricinum (Meisn.) Pedley

Species of plant

Habit in Dead Mans Swamp Nature Reserve, near Arthur River

Acacia laricina is a species of flowering plant in the family Fabaceae and is endemic to the south-west of Western Australia. It is a dense, spreading, semi-prostrate, more or less domed shrub with hairy branchlets, crowded phyllodes continuous with the branchlets and five-sided in cross section, and thinly leathery terete to subterete pods.

== Description ==
Acacia laricina is a dense, spreading, semi-prostrate, more or less domed shrub that typically grows to a height of 0.25–0.5 m (0.8–1.6 ft) and has branchlets covered in a fine, white powdery coating and hairs pressed against the surface. Its phyllodes are crowded, continuous with the branchlets, ascending to erect, straight to slightly curved, five-sided in cross section, 15–50 mm (0.59–1.97 in) long and 0.7–1.7 mm (0.028–0.067 in) wide. The phyllodes have on oblique pointed tip, five prominent veins, and there are linear to triangular or bristly stipules 3–6 mm (0.12–0.24 in) long at the base. The flowers are borne in a single spherical head in axils on a hairy peduncle usually 7–20 mm (0.28–0.79 in) long, the heads with 17 to 30 cream-coloured to pale yellow flowers.

== Taxonomy ==
Acacia laricina was first formally described in 1844 by Carl Meissner in Lehmann's Plantae Preissianae in 1840. The specific epithet (laricina) means 'Larch tree-like'.

In 1999, Bruce Maslin described two varieties of A. laricina in the journal Nuytsia, and the names are accepted by the Australian Plant Census:

- Acacia laricina var. crassifolia Maslin has slightly roughened, straight to slightly curved phyllodes, peduncles 3–10 mm (0.12–0.39 in) long and pods about 2 mm (0.079 in) wide.
- Acacia laricina Meisn. var. laricina has smooth, mostly slightly curved phyllodes, peduncles 10–20 mm (0.39–0.79 in) long and pods about 4 mm (0.16 in) wide.

== Distribution and habitat ==
This species of wattle occurs in the southwest of Western Australia between Dumbleyung, Frankland, Western Australia and near the Oldfield River in the Avon Wheatbelt, Esperance Plains, Jarrah Forest and Mallee bioregions.

- Variety crassifolia grows in loamy sand or sand over clay on rocky ridges in open mallee scrub and is confined to the Ravensthorpe Range, near Ravensthorpe.
- Var. laricina often grows in gravelly sand in woodland or low shrubland.

== Conservation status ==
Acacia laricina and both subspecies are listed as 'not threatened' by the Government of Western Australia Department of Biodiversity, Conservation and Attractions.

== See also ==
- List of Acacia species
