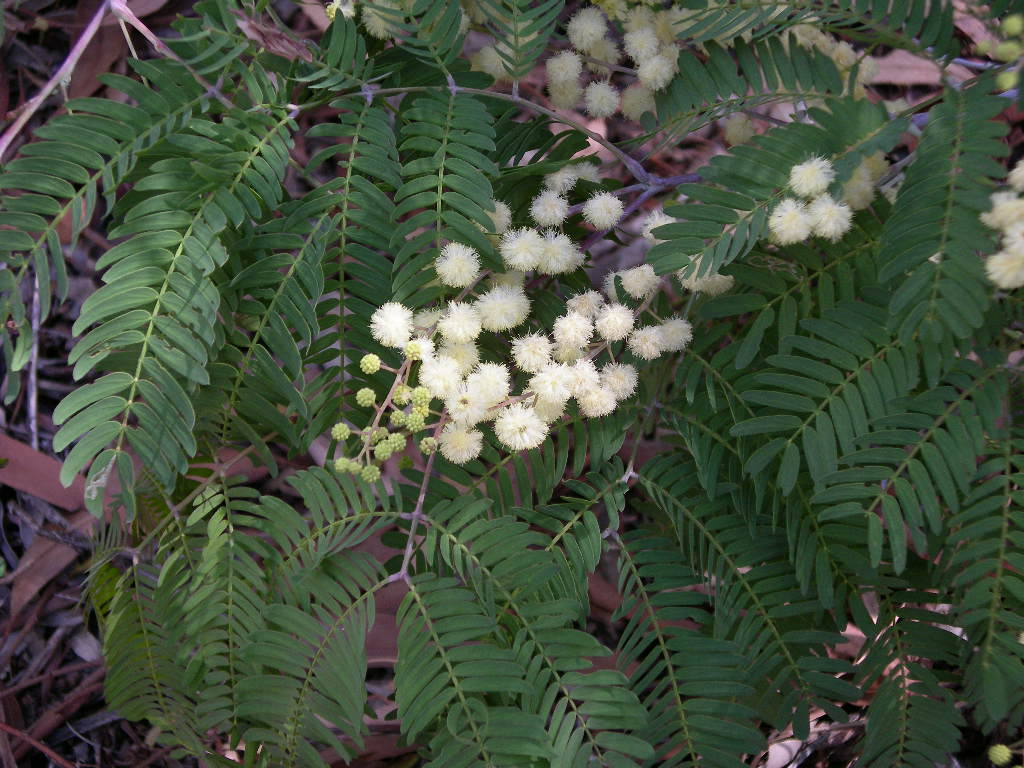

Scientific classification
- Kingdom: Plantae
- Clade: Tracheophytes
- Clade: Angiosperms
- Clade: Eudicots
- Clade: Rosids
- Order: Fabales
- Family: Fabaceae
- Subfamily: Caesalpinioideae
- Clade: Mimosoid clade
- Genus: Acacia
- Species: A. schinoides

Binomial name
- Acacia schinoides Benth.
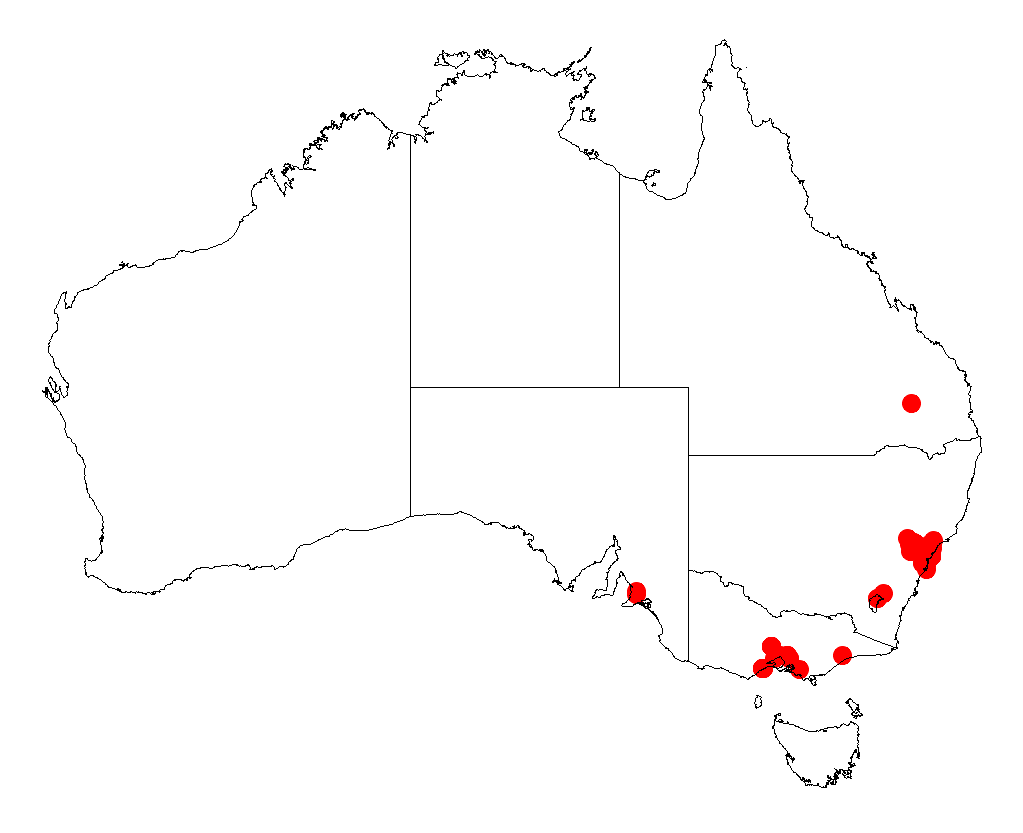
- Occurrence data from AVH

Synonyms
- Acacia pruinosa auct. non Benth.

= Acacia schinoides =

Species of legume

Acacia schinoides is a shrub or tree indigenous to Australia. It has also been introduced into Kenya and Zimbabwe and it is cultivated there. A common name for the plant in Australia is green cedar wattle.

== Description ==
Acacia schinoides grows to a height of 2 to 10 metres (7 to 33 ft) In summer it bears cream-colored, ball-shaped flowers. It is a, "Fast-growing tree in well-composted soil."

== Uses ==
The shrub makes a good garden hedge.

== Natural growing conditions ==
Acacia schinoides can withstand frosts as low as −7 °C. It does well in both shade and sun.

== Bibliography ==
- Bentham, George (1842). Hooker, William Jackson (ed.). "Notes on Mimoseae, with a Synopsis of Species". The London Journal of Botany (in Latin). 1. London: H. Baillièr: 318–392.
- Bentham, George; Mueller, Ferdinand von, Freiherr (1864). Flora australiensis:a description of the plants of the Australian territory. Vol. v. 2. London: L. Reeve and co.
