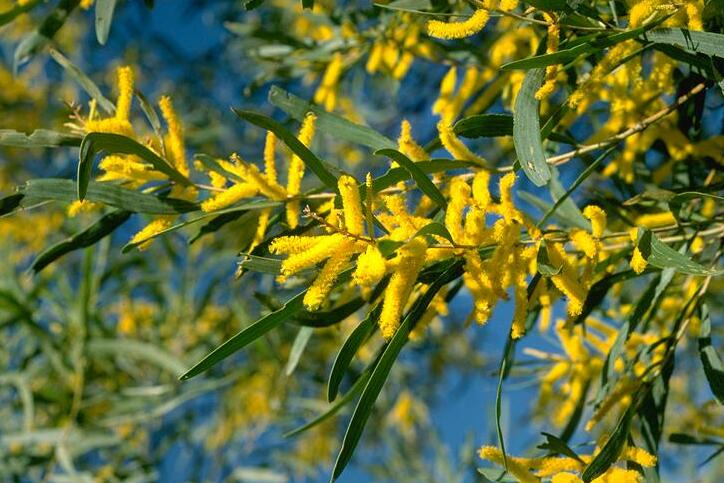

Scientific classification
- Kingdom: Plantae
- Clade: Embryophytes
- Clade: Tracheophytes
- Clade: Spermatophytes
- Clade: Angiosperms
- Clade: Eudicots
- Clade: Rosids
- Order: Fabales
- Family: Fabaceae
- Subfamily: Caesalpinioideae
- Clade: Mimosoid clade
- Genus: Acacia
- Species: A. torulosa

Binomial name
- Acacia torulosa Benth.
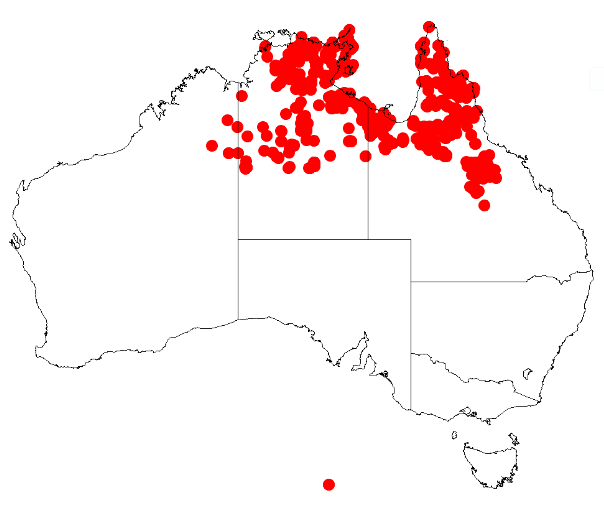
- Occurrence data from AVH

= Acacia torulosa =

Species of legume

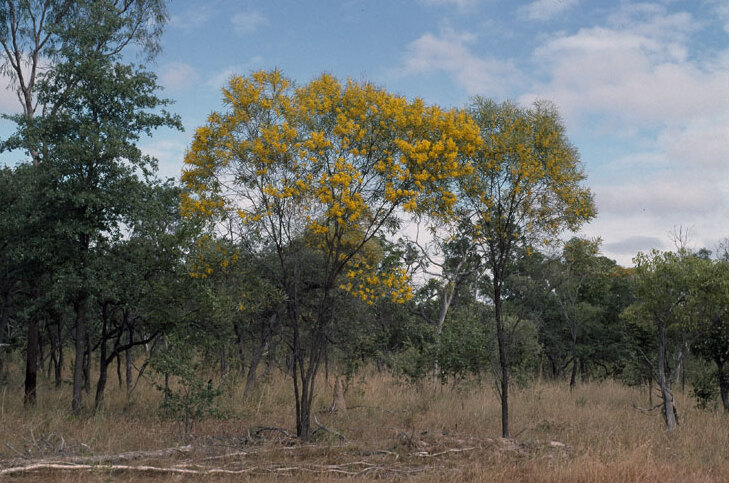
Habit

Acacia torulosa is a shrub or tree belonging to the genus Acacia and the subgenus Juliflorae that is native to north eastern Australia.

One common name is "Thancoupie".

== Description ==
The somewhat resinous shrub or tree typically grows to a height of 1.3 to 15 m (4 ft 3 in to 49 ft 3 in). It has brown to grey coloured bark that become flaky with age. The glabrous are angled to terete. Like most species of Acacia it has phyllodes rather than true leaves. The thinly to moderately coriaceous phyllodes are a yellowish green colour and have a linear to very narrowly elliptic shape with a length of 5 to 20 cm (2.0 to 7.9 in) and a width of 4 to 18 mm (0.16 to 0.71 in). They are scurfy when mature and have a prominent midnerve and one or two more prominent nerves. It blooms between March and July producing golden flowers. The cylindrical flower-spikes are 1 to 4 cm (0.39 to 1.57 in) in length. The glabrous and linear seed pods that form after flowering and resemble a string of beads that are convex over the seeds. The pods are 6 to 20 cm (2.4 to 7.9 in) in length and 3 to 6.5 mm (0.12 to 0.26 in) wide and have longitudinally arranged nerves and ridges. The dark brown seeds within the pods are arranged longitudinally. The seeds have an elliptic shape and are 4.5 to 6.5 mm (0.18 to 0.26 in) in length and have a narrowly oblong areole.

== Distribution ==
It is endemic to the tropical areas of the Northern Territory and Queensland where it is often situated on rocky hillsides or around beaches or watercourses growing in alluvial sandy soils as a part of Eucalyptus woodland or mixed shrubland communities.

== See also ==
- List of Acacia species
