= Acacia pellita =

Scientific classification
- Kingdom: Plantae
- Clade: Tracheophytes
- Clade: Angiosperms
- Clade: Eudicots
- Clade: Rosids
- Order: Fabales
- Family: Fabaceae
- Subfamily: Caesalpinioideae
- Clade: Mimosoid clade
- Genus: Acacia
- Species: A. pellita

Binomial name
- Acacia pellita O.Schwarz
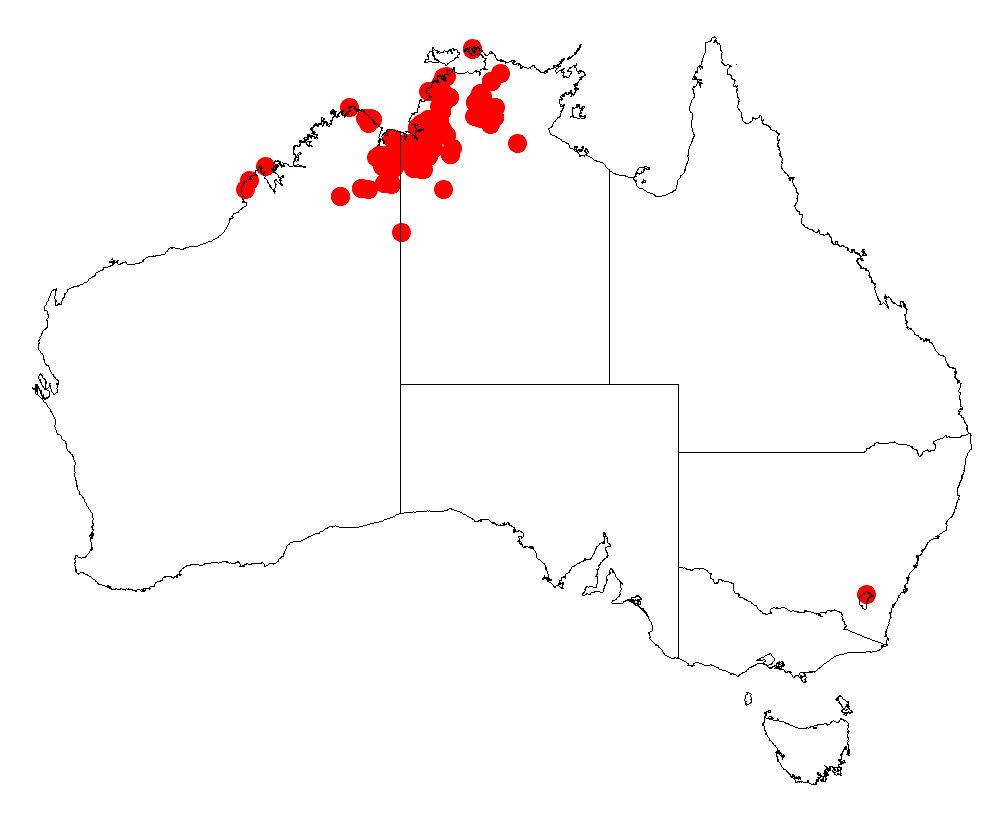
- Occurrence data from AVH

Species of legume

Acacia pellita is a shrub or tree belonging to the genus Acacia and the subgenus Juliflorae that is endemic to parts of tropical northern Australia.

== Description ==
The shrub or tree typically grows to a height of 3 to 6 metres (10 to 20 ft) and has grey or brown coloured bark that is slightly fibrous. It has slightly angular ribbed branchlets that are covered by a dense matting of woolly hairs. Like most species of Acacia it has phyllodes rather than true leaves. The evergreen phyllodes have a narrowly elliptic shape with a length of 10.5 to 19.5 cm (4.1 to 7.7 in) and a width of 30 to 100 mm (1.2 to 3.9 in). The papery to slightly coriaceous phyllodes have two to four prominent main nerves that are concurrent with each other. It blooms from May to August producing yellow flowers. The cylindrical flower-spikes are 3 to 7 cm (1.2 to 2.8 in) in length and packed with golden coloured flowers. After flowering densely haired seed pods form that are tightly coiled in masses with a length of around 7 cm (2.8 in) and a width of 3.5 to 5 mm (0.14 to 0.20 in) with longitudinally arranged seeds inside. The black coloured seeds have an oblong shape and are 3.9 to 4.5 mm (0.15 to 0.18 in) in length with an oblong open areole.

== Distribution ==
It is native to a large area in the Northern Territory and the Kimberley region of Western Australia where the plant will grow in sandy or loamy soils and prefers damp conditions. It is often situated along creek banks growing in sandy soils as a part of Eucalyptus woodland communities where it is often found in shady locations on or around sandstone or laterite.

== See also ==
- List of Acacia species
