= Acacia tindaleae =

Scientific classification
- Kingdom: Plantae
- Clade: Tracheophytes
- Clade: Angiosperms
- Clade: Eudicots
- Clade: Rosids
- Order: Fabales
- Family: Fabaceae
- Subfamily: Caesalpinioideae
- Clade: Mimosoid clade
- Genus: Acacia
- Species: A. tindaleae

Binomial name
- Acacia tindaleae Pedley
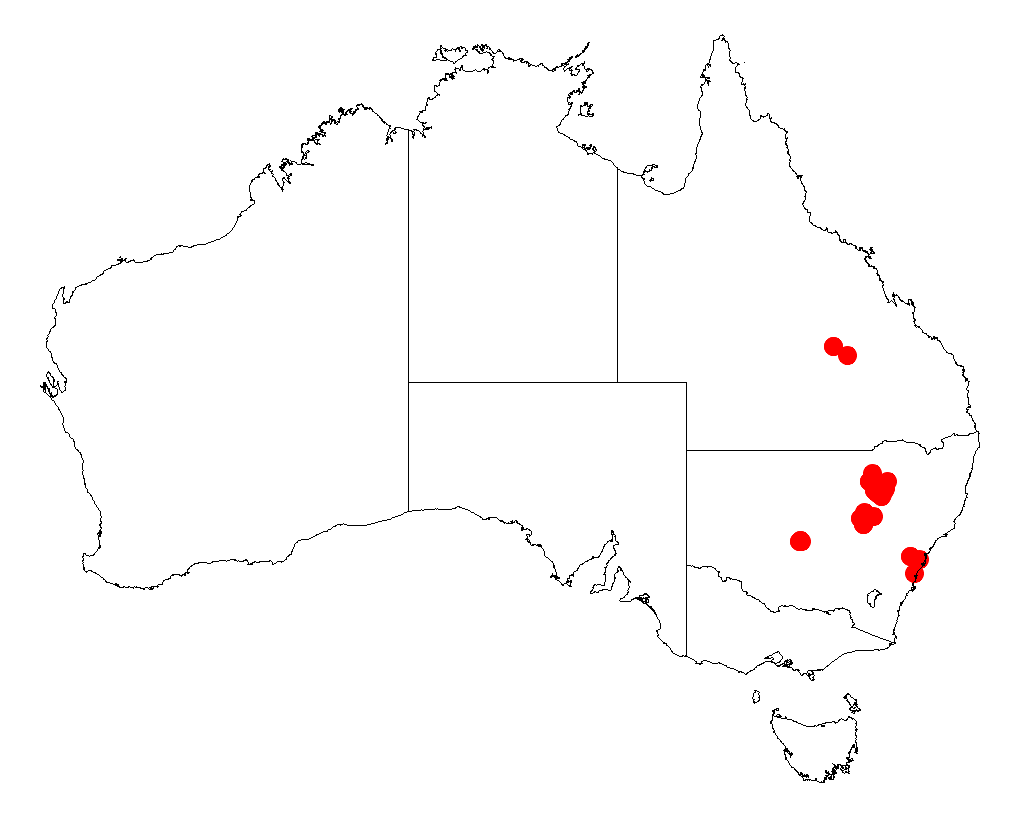
- Occurrence data from AVH

Species of legume

Acacia tindaleae is a shrub of the genus Acacia and the subgenus Phyllodineae. It is native to an area in central New South Wales and a small area in southern Queensland.

The spreading compact shrub typically grows to a height of 2 metres (7 ft).

== See also ==
- List of Acacia species
