= Acacia proiantha =

Scientific classification
- Kingdom: Plantae
- Clade: Tracheophytes
- Clade: Angiosperms
- Clade: Eudicots
- Clade: Rosids
- Order: Fabales
- Family: Fabaceae
- Subfamily: Caesalpinioideae
- Clade: Mimosoid clade
- Genus: Acacia
- Species: A. proiantha

Binomial name
- Acacia proiantha Pedley
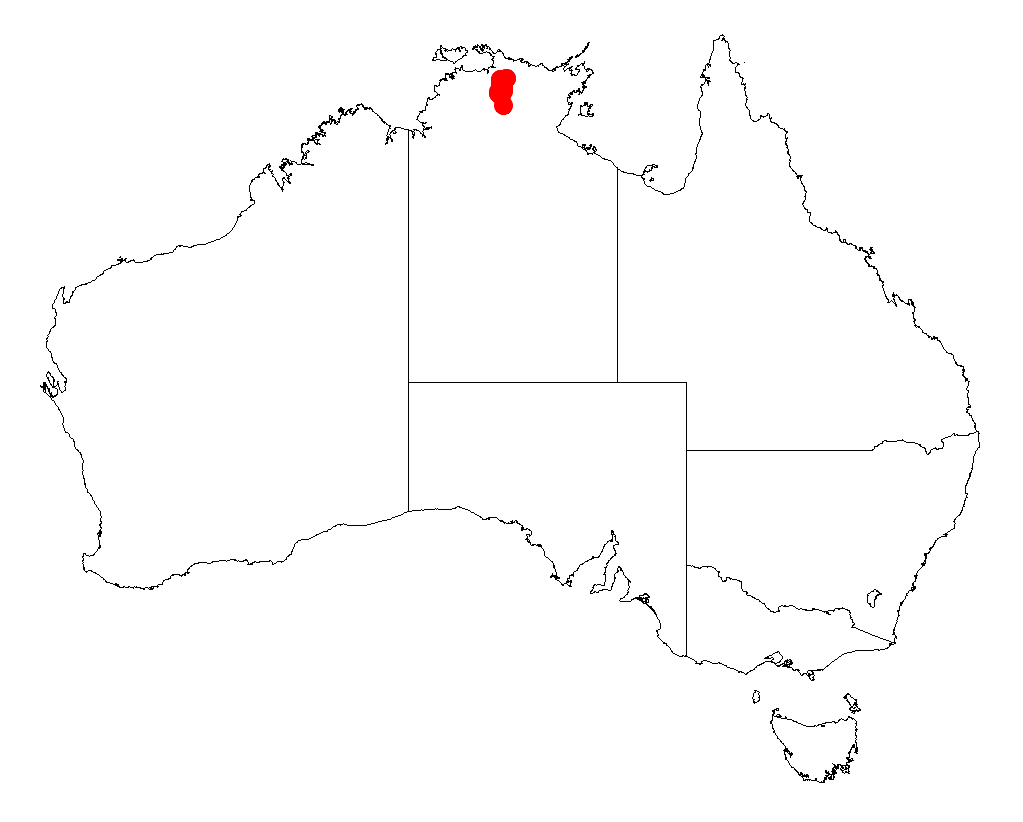
- Occurrence data from AVH

Species of legume

Acacia proiantha is a species of wattle native to the Northern Territory, Australia.
