= Acacia seclusa =

Conservation status
- Priority One — Poorly Known Taxa (DEC)

Scientific classification
- Kingdom: Plantae
- Clade: Tracheophytes
- Clade: Angiosperms
- Clade: Eudicots
- Clade: Rosids
- Order: Fabales
- Family: Fabaceae
- Subfamily: Caesalpinioideae
- Clade: Mimosoid clade
- Genus: Acacia
- Species: A. seclusa

Binomial name
- Acacia seclusa M.W.McDonald

Species of legume

Acacia seclusa, commonly known as saw range wattle, is a small tree belonging to the genus Acacia and the subgenus Juliflorae that is endemic to northern Australia.

== Description ==
The tree typically grows to a height of 6 metres (20 ft). The canopy has a spreading habit that is silvery to bluish in colour. The hard, grey bark is shallowly rimose. Like most species of Acacia it has phyllodes rather than true leaves. It has narrowly-elliptic to narrowly-dimidiate shaped phyllodes that are straight with a length of 10 to 15 cm (3.9 to 5.9 in) and a width of 1 to 2.5 cm (0.39 to 0.98 in). The coriaceous and sericeous phyllodes are grey-green; in colour and have many longitudinal nerves that are close together and three main longitudinal nerves. It blooms from August producing yellow flowers. The simple inflorescences occur singly or in pairs in the axils or are racemose. The cylindrical flower-spikes have a length of 2 to 5 cm (0.79 to 1.97 in) with densely packed yellow to pale golden coloured flowers. Following flowering seed pods form that have a narrowly oblong shape and can be constricted between the seeds. The woody and grooved pods are sub-terete to slightly flattened and can be straight to slightly curved with a length of 4 to 7 cm (1.6 to 2.8 in) with a width of 6 to 8 mm (0.24 to 0.31 in) The glossy black seeds inside are elliptic to irregularly elliptic with a length of around 4 mm (0.16 in) and a width of 3 mm (0.12 in).

== Distribution ==
It is native to a small area in the eastern Kimberley region of Western Australia where it is mostly found in riparian areas. The restricted range is among the Saw Range close to Dillon Springs in the steep rocky slopes around the spring.

== See also ==
- List of Acacia species
