= Acacia rubricaulis =

Scientific classification
- Kingdom: Plantae
- Clade: Tracheophytes
- Clade: Angiosperms
- Clade: Eudicots
- Clade: Rosids
- Order: Fabales
- Family: Fabaceae
- Subfamily: Caesalpinioideae
- Clade: Mimosoid clade
- Genus: Acacia
- Species: A. rubricaulis

Binomial name
- Acacia rubricaulis Pedley

Species of legume

Acacia rubricaulis is a shrub belonging to the genus Acacia and the subgenus Juliflorae that is native to a small area in north eastern Australia.

== Description ==
The shrub typically grows to a height of 2 to 6 m (6 ft 7 in to 19 ft 8 in). The stout branchlets have a polished appearance and are a dark red colour and glabrous. The branchlets are usually steeply angled towards the apex. Like most species of Acacia it has phyllodes rather than true leaves. The evergreen phyllodes have an ovate or elliptic shape and are usually straight or slightly sickle shaped. The glabrous phyllodes have a length of 13.5 to 19 cm (5.3 to 7.5 in) and a width of 22 to 44 mm (0.87 to 1.73 in) with three longitudinal nerves that are more prominent than the rest. When it blooms it produces simple inflorescences simple in pairs in the axils with cylindrical flower-spikes that are sub-densely flowered and have a length of 40 to 60 mm (1.6 to 2.4 in) in length but can reach up to 100 mm (3.9 in) in length. The seed pods that form after flowering are flat and glabrous and have a narrowly oblong shape with a length of 5 to 6 mm (0.20 to 0.24 in) and a width of 7 to 10 mm (0.28 to 0.39 in).

== Distribution ==
It is endemic to the northern part of Cape York Peninsula where it is situated on degraded sand dunes, on dune fields and creek banks growing in sandy soils.

== See also ==
- List of Acacia species
