= Acacia repens =

Scientific classification
- Kingdom: Plantae
- Clade: Tracheophytes
- Clade: Angiosperms
- Clade: Eudicots
- Clade: Rosids
- Order: Fabales
- Family: Fabaceae
- Subfamily: Caesalpinioideae
- Clade: Mimosoid clade
- Genus: Acacia
- Species: A. repens

Binomial name
- Acacia repens A.S.George

Species of plant

Acacia repens is a shrub belonging to the genus Acacia and the subgenus Lycopodiifoliae. It is native to a small area in the Kimberley region of Western Australia.

The sprawling, scrambling shrub blooms in June and produces yellow flowers.

== See also ==
- List of Acacia species
