= C. aurea =

C. aurea may refer to:

- Calamagrostis aurea, a grass species found only in Ecuador
- Calpurnia aurea, a tree species found in Southern Africa
- Calytrix aurea, a shrub species endemic to the south-west of Western Australia
- Canalispira aurea, a very small sea snail species
- Carex aurea, the golden sedge, a plant species native to much of North America
- Cattleya aurea, the golden yellow cattleya, an orchid species
- Chysis aurea, an orchid species
- Clathrina aurea, a sponge species
- Corydalis aurea, the scrambled eggs, golden corydalis, golden smoke, a medicinal and poisonous plant species native to North America

== See also ==
- Aurea (disambiguation)
