= Calytrix gomphrenoides =

Conservation status
- Priority Four — Rare Taxa (DEC)

Scientific classification
- Kingdom: Plantae
- Clade: Tracheophytes
- Clade: Angiosperms
- Clade: Eudicots
- Clade: Rosids
- Order: Myrtales
- Family: Myrtaceae
- Genus: Calytrix
- Species: C. gomphrenoides

Binomial name
- Calytrix gomphrenoides M.D.Barrett & Craven

Species of flowering plant

Calytrix gomphrenoides is a species of flowering plant in the myrtle family Myrtaceae and is endemic to the Kimberley region of Western Australia. It is a glabrous, multi-stemmed shrub with linear leaves and white flowers turning pink as they age, with 16 to 18 stamens in a single row.

== Description ==
Calytrix gomphrenoides is a glabrous, multistemmed shrub that typically grows to a height of up to 50 cm (20 in) and has linear leaves that are mostly 4–10 mm (0.16–0.39 in) long and 0.4–0.8 mm (0.016–0.031 in) wide on a petiole 0.9–1.2 mm (0.035–0.047 in) long. There are stipules up to 0.25 mm (0.0098 in) long at the base of the petioles. The flowers are borne in dense heads of 15 to 40 flowers on the ends of branches on a peduncle about 0.3 mm (0.012 in) long. There are papery bracteoles 6.5–8.0 mm (0.26–0.31 in) long and 2.2–2.4 mm (0.087–0.094 in) wide, but that fall off after the flowers open. The floral tube is 19–13 mm (0.75–0.51 in) long, almost free from the style and has 10 ribs. The sepals are joined at the base, more or less round to egg-shaped, 1.7–2.5 mm (0.067–0.098 in) long, excludiong an awn 11–12 mm (0.43–0.47 in) long. The petals are white, turning pink on the outside with a dark red base, narrowly egg-shaped, 5.5–7.2 mm (0.22–0.28 in) long and 1.7–1.9 mm (0.067–0.075 in) wide. There are 16 to 18 white stamens that turn pink, then dark red, 3.5–9.0 mm (0.14–0.35 in) long in a single row. Flowering occurs from January to May.

== Taxonomy ==
Calytrix gomphrenoides was first formally described in 2009 by Matthew David Barrett and Lyndley Craven in the journal Nuytsia from specimens collected near falls on a tributary of Bachsten Creek in the Kimberley region of Western Australia in 1999. The specific epithet (gomphrenoides) refers to the similarity of this species to Gomphrena canescens.

== Distribution and habitat ==
This species of Calytrix grows in shallow sand on sandstone pavements in the ranges aroung the Prince Regent River in the Kimberley region of Western Australia.

== Conservation status ==
Calytrix gomphrenoides is listed as "Priority Four" by the Government of Western Australia Department of Biodiversity, Conservation and Attractions, meaning that is rare or near threatened.
