= Calytrix micrairoides =

Scientific classification
- Kingdom: Plantae
- Clade: Tracheophytes
- Clade: Angiosperms
- Clade: Eudicots
- Clade: Rosids
- Order: Myrtales
- Family: Myrtaceae
- Genus: Calytrix
- Species: C. micrairoides

Binomial name
- Calytrix micrairoides (F.Muell.) Benth.

Species of flowering plant

Calytrix micrairoides is a species of flowering plant in the myrtle family Myrtaceae and is endemic to the Northern Territory. It is a prostrate shrub with linear leaves, pink flowers with a paler base, and about 40 to 45 white stamens in several rows.

== Description ==
Calytrix micrairoides is a prostrate, glabrous shrub linear leaves, 4–7 mm (0.16–0.28 in) long, 0.5–0.9 mm (0.020–0.035 in) wide and sessile or on a petiole up to 0.5 mm (0.020 in) long. There are no stipules at the base of the petiole. The flowers are borne on a funnel-shaped peduncle 7.5–9.5 mm (0.30–0.37 in) long with elliptic to egg-shaped lobes 4.5–5.5 mm (0.18–0.22 in) long. The floral tube is free from the style, 12–13 mm (0.47–0.51 in) long and has 10 ribs. The sepals are fused at the base, with egg-shaped to more or less round lobes 2.5–3.5 mm (0.098–0.138 in) long and 3.0–3.5 mm (0.12–0.14 in) wide, with an awn up to 14 mm (0.55 in) long. The petals are pink with a white base, narrowly elliptic, 12–14 mm (0.47–0.55 in) long and 3–4 mm (0.12–0.16 in) wide, and there are about 40 to 45 white stamens that become reddish after the flowers open. Flowering occurs from February to July.

== Taxonomy ==
Calytrix micrairoides was first formally described in 1987 by Lyndley Craven in the journal Brunonia from specimens he collected in the Northern Territory in 1973. The specific epithet (micrairoides) alludes to the habit of this species, being similar to the grass Micraira, with which it often grows.

== Distribution and habitat ==
This species of Calytrix grows on rock pavements, its roots growing adventitiously in crevices and pockets of sand in western Arnhem Land in the Northern Territory.

== Conservation status ==
Calytrix micrairoides is listed as of "least concern" under the Territory Parks and Wildlife Conservation Act.
