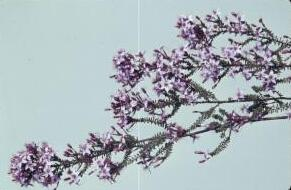

Scientific classification
- Kingdom: Plantae
- Clade: Embryophytes
- Clade: Tracheophytes
- Clade: Spermatophytes
- Clade: Angiosperms
- Clade: Eudicots
- Clade: Rosids
- Order: Myrtales
- Family: Myrtaceae
- Genus: Calytrix
- Species: C. tenuiramea

Binomial name
- Calytrix tenuiramea (Turcz.) Benth.

Synonyms
- Calycothrix tenuiramea Turcz.; Calythrix tenuiramea Benth. orth. var.

= Calytrix tenuiramea =

Species of flowering plant

Calytrix tenuiramea is a species of flowering plant in the myrtle family Myrtaceae and is endemic to the south-west of Western Australia. It is a glabrous shrub with linear to narrowly elliptic leaves and purple flowers with about 40 to 50 stamens in several rows.

== Description ==
Calytrix tenuiramea is a glabrous shrub that typically grows to a height of up to 60 cm (24 in), new growth continuing from the tips of the flowering stems. Its leaves are linear to narrowly elliptic, 2–7 mm (0.079–0.276 in) long, 0.5–1 mm (0.020–0.039 in) wide, on a petiole up to 0.25–0.75 mm (0.0098–0.0295 in) long. The flowers are borne on a narrowly funnel-shaped peduncle 4.5–8 mm (0.18–0.31 in) long with elliptic to egg-shaped lobes 2–4 mm (0.079–0.157 in) long. The floral tube is 6–7.5 mm (0.24–0.30 in) long and has 10 ribs. The sepals are joined up to 0.5 mm (0.020 in) at the base, the lobes egg-shaped to broadly egg-shaped with the narrower end towards the base, 1–2.5 mm (0.039–0.098 in) long and 1.25–1.7 mm (0.049–0.067 in) wide with an awn up to 10 mm (0.39 in) long. The petals are purple, elliptic to narrowly elliptic or lance-shaped, 5–8.5 mm (0.20–0.33 in) long and 2.0–2.25 mm (0.079–0.089 in) wide with about 40 t0 50 stamens 1.5–5 mm (0.059–0.197 in) long. Flowering usually occurs from January to March.

== Taxonomy ==
This species was first formally described in 1849 by Nikolai Turczaninow who gave it the name Calycothrix tenuiramea in the Bulletin de la Société impériale des naturalistes de Moscou, from specimens collected by James Drummond.

In 1867, George Bentham transferred the species to the genus Calytrix as C. tenuiramea in his Flora Australiensis. The specific epithet (tenuiramea) means 'thin-branched'.

== Distribution and habitat ==
Calytrix tenuiramea is found from near Bunbury to near Albany where grows on stunted jarrah and Banksia forest in the Esperance Plains, Jarrah Forest and Warren bioregions of south-western Western Australia.

== Conservation status ==
This species of Calytrix is listed as "not threatened" by the Government of Western Australia Department of Biodiversity, Conservation and Attractions.
