= Calytrix warburtonensis =

Conservation status
- Priority Two — Poorly Known Taxa (DEC)

Scientific classification
- Kingdom: Plantae
- Clade: Tracheophytes
- Clade: Angiosperms
- Clade: Eudicots
- Clade: Rosids
- Order: Myrtales
- Family: Myrtaceae
- Genus: Calytrix
- Species: C. warburtonensis

Binomial name
- Calytrix warburtonensis Craven

Species of flowering plant

Calytrix warburtonensis is a species of flowering plant in the myrtle family, Myrtaceae and is endemic to eastern inland areas of Western Australia. It is a glabrous shrub with linear, lance-shaped or egg-shaped leaves with the narrower end towards the base, and white star-shaped flowers with 23 to 28 stamens in a single row.

== Description ==
Calytrix warburtonensis is a glabrous shrub that typically grows to a height of up to 60 cm (24 in). Its leaves are linear, lance-shaped to egg-shaped with the narrower end towards the base, sometimes almost round, 1–3 mm (0.039–0.118 in) long and 0.5–1 mm (0.020–0.039 in) wide on a petiole 0.2–0.75 mm (0.0079–0.0295 in) long, with stipules up to 0.5 mm (0.020 in) long at the base of the petiole. The flowers are borne singly or in small groups on a peduncle 2.5–3.0 mm (0.098–0.118 in) long. The bracteoles are mostly free from each other, egg-shaped with the narrower end towards the base, 2.5 mm (0.098 in) long. The floral tube is 11–15 mm (0.43–0.59 in) long and has ten ribs. The sepals are elliptic to egg-shaped with the narrower end towards the base, about 2 mm (0.079 in) long wide with an awn up to 16 mm (0.63 in) long. The petals are white, narrowly elliptic to elliptic, 5.5–7 mm (0.22–0.28 in) long, 2.0–2.5 mm (0.079–0.098 in) wide and there are about 23 to 28 stamens in a single row, the filaments white 2.0–7.5 mm (0.079–0.295 in) long. Flowering has been recorded in September and October.

== Taxonomy ==
Calytrix warburtonensis was first formally described in 1987 by Lyndley Craven in the journal Brunonia from specimens collected by Alex George at the Winduldurra Rockhole, 80 km (50 mi) south-west of Warburton in 1966. The specific epithet (warburtonensis) means 'native of Warburton'.

== Distribution and habitat ==
This species of Calytrix grows in an open, gravelly area on rocky hills, slopes and breakaways, in the Warburton Range district in the north-west of the Gibson Desert and Great Victoria Desert bioregions of inland Western Australia.

== Conservation status ==
Calytrix warburtonensis is listed as "Priority Two" by the Government of Western Australia Department of Biodiversity, Conservation and Attractions, meaning that it is poorly known and from one or a few locations.
