= Calytrix megaphylla =

Scientific classification
- Kingdom: Plantae
- Clade: Tracheophytes
- Clade: Angiosperms
- Clade: Eudicots
- Clade: Rosids
- Order: Myrtales
- Family: Myrtaceae
- Genus: Calytrix
- Species: C. megaphylla

Binomial name
- Calytrix megaphylla (F.Muell.) Benth.

Species of flowering plant

Calytrix megaphylla is a species of flowering plant in the myrtle family Myrtaceae and is endemic to the Northern Territory. It is a shrub with linear to narrowly elliptic leaves and pink to pinkish mauve or reddish purple flowers with a paler base, and with about 20 to 50 pink stamens in several rows.

== Description ==
Calytrix megaphylla is a glabrous shrub that typically grows to a height of up to 1.5 m (4 ft 11 in). Its leaves are linear to narrowly elliptic, 6–14 mm (0.24–0.55 in) long and 0.75–2 mm (0.030–0.079 in) wide on a petiole 0.50–0.75 mm (0.020–0.030 in) long. There are stipules up to 0.5 mm (0.020 in) long at the base of the petiole. The flowers are borne on a peduncle 1.5–2.0 mm (0.059–0.079 in) long with lance-shaped bracteoles 4–7 mm (0.16–0.28 in) long. The floral tube is free from the style, 12–18 mm (0.47–0.71 in) long and has 10 ribs. The sepals are fused at the base, with more or less round lobes 2.5–4.0 mm (0.098–0.157 in) long and wide, with an awn up to 15 mm (0.59 in) long. The petals are pink to pinkish mauve or reddish purple, paler near the base, narrowly elliptic, 12–15 mm (0.47–0.59 in) long and 3–4 mm (0.12–0.16 in) wide, and there are about 20 to 50 pink stamens in several rows. Flowering occurs from January to July.

== Taxonomy ==
This species was first formally described in 1858 by Ferdinand von Mueller who gave it the name Calycothrix megaphylla in his Fragmenta phytographiae Australiae from specimens collected by Augustus Charles Gregory. In 1867, George Bentham transferred the species to Calytrix as C. megaphylla in his Flora Australiensis. The specific epithet (megaphylla) means 'large-leaved'.

== Distribution and habitat ==
This species of Calytrix grows in heath and heathy woodland on sandstone on sandplains on the McAdam Range and in western Arnhem Land in the Northern Territory.

== Conservation status ==
Calytrix megaphylla is listed as of "least concern" under the Territory Parks and Wildlife Conservation Act.
