= Calytrix surdiviperana =

Scientific classification
- Kingdom: Plantae
- Clade: Tracheophytes
- Clade: Angiosperms
- Clade: Eudicots
- Clade: Rosids
- Order: Myrtales
- Family: Myrtaceae
- Genus: Calytrix
- Species: C. surdiviperana

Binomial name
- Calytrix surdiviperana Craven

Species of flowering plant

Calytrix surdiviperana is a species of flowering plant in the myrtle family Myrtaceae and is endemic to north of the Northern Territory. It is a glabrous shrub with linear to lance-shaped leaves and pale pink flowers with about 30 to 40 stamens in several rows.

== Description ==
Calytrix surdiviperana is a mostly glabrous shrub that typically grows to a height of 1.5 m (4 ft 11 in) and grows from the tips of the flowering stems. Its leaves are linear to lance-shaped, 7–12 mm (0.28–0.47 in) long and 1.0–1.6 mm (0.039–0.063 in) wide on a petiole 0.5–1 mm (0.020–0.039 in) long, with stipules up to 3 mm (0.12 in) long at the base of the petiole. The flowers are on a peduncle 1.5–3 mm (0.059–0.118 in) long with egg-shaped bracteoles with the narrower end towards the base, 6–7 mm (0.24–0.28 in) long. The floral tube is more or less cylindrical, 10–13 mm (0.39–0.51 in) long and has ten ribs. The sepals are egg-shaped to more or less round, 2.0–2.5 mm (0.079–0.098 in) long, 2.5–3.0 mm (0.098–0.118 in) wide with an awn up to 14 mm (0.55 in) long. The petals are pale pink, narrowly elliptic, 8.5–10 mm (0.33–0.39 in) long and 1.5–2.5 mm (0.059–0.098 in) wide and there are about 30 to 40 stamens with pale pink filaments in two rows. Flowering occurs from February to May.

== Taxonomy ==
Calytrix surdiviperana was first formally described in 1980 by Lyndley Craven in the journal Brunonia from specimens collected in Death Adder Gorge in 1977.

== Distribution and habitat ==
This species of Calytrix grows on sandstone on the exposed crest of escarpments in the Kakadu and Nitmiluk National Parks in the north of the Northern Territory.

== Conservation status ==
Calytrix surdiviperana is listed as of "near threatened" under the Territory Parks and Wildlife Conservation Act.
