= Calytrix mimiana =

Scientific classification
- Kingdom: Plantae
- Clade: Tracheophytes
- Clade: Angiosperms
- Clade: Eudicots
- Clade: Rosids
- Order: Myrtales
- Family: Myrtaceae
- Genus: Calytrix
- Species: C. mimiana

Binomial name
- Calytrix mimiana (F.Muell.) Benth.

Species of flowering plant

Calytrix mimiana is a species of flowering plant in the myrtle family Myrtaceae and is endemic to the Northern Territory. It is a glabrous shrub with linear to narrowly lance-shaped leaves with the narrower end towards the base, deep pink to pinkish-mauve flowers, and about 35 to 40 white stamens in several rows, that turn pinkish as they age.

== Description ==
Calytrix mimiana is a glabrous shrub that typically grows to a height of up to 1.5 m (4 ft 11 in). Its leaves are linear to narrowly lance-shaped, 3–10 mm (0.12–0.39 in) long and 0.5–0.8 mm (0.020–0.031 in) wide with the narrower end towards the base on a petiole 0.5–1 mm (0.020–0.039 in) long. There are stipules up to 0.4 mm (0.016 in) long at the base of the petiole. The flowers are borne in clusters on a peduncle 0.5–1 mm (0.020–0.039 in) long with narrowly lance-shaped bracteoles 3.5–6 mm (0.14–0.24 in) long. The floral tube is free from the style, 6.5–8 mm (0.26–0.31 in) long and has eight to ten ribs. The sepals are fused at the base, with egg-shaped lobes 1.0–1.25 mm (0.039–0.049 in) long and 0.8–1 mm (0.031–0.039 in) wide, the awn up to 7 mm (0.28 in) long. The petals are deep pink to pinkish-mauve, elliptic to lance-shaped, 4.5–6.0 mm (0.18–0.24 in) long and 1.75–2.5 mm (0.069–0.098 in) wide, and there are about 30 to 35 white stamens that become pinkish after the flowers open. Flowering occurs from January to July.

== Taxonomy ==
Calytrix mimiana was first formally described in 1980 by Lyndley Craven in the journal Brunonia from specimens he collected near the Caranbirini Waterhole in 1977.

== Distribution and habitat ==
This species of Calytrix grows in crevices on a sandstone escarpment in the McArthur River district in the Gulf Fall and Uplands bioregion of the Northern Territory.

== Conservation status ==
Calytrix mimiana is listed as of "near threatened" under the Territory Parks and Wildlife Conservation Act.
