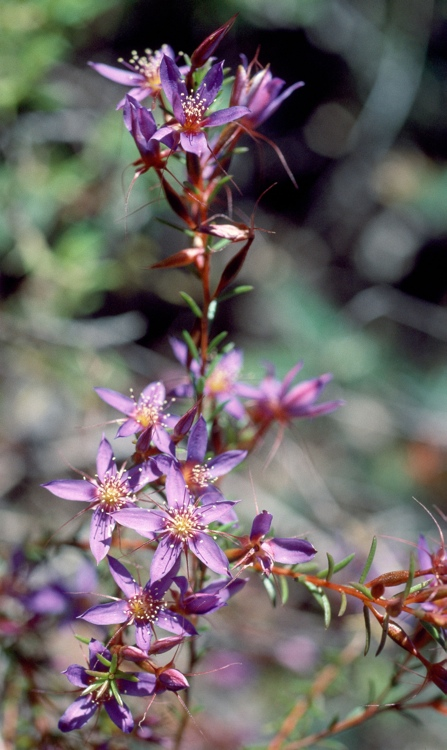
- In John Forrest National Park

Scientific classification
- Kingdom: Plantae
- Clade: Tracheophytes
- Clade: Angiosperms
- Clade: Eudicots
- Clade: Rosids
- Order: Myrtales
- Family: Myrtaceae
- Genus: Calytrix
- Species: C. variabilis

Binomial name
- Calytrix variabilis Lindl.

Synonyms
- Calycothrix variabilis (Lindl.) Schauer; Calythrix variabilis Benth. orth. var.

= Calytrix variabilis =

Species of flowering plant

Calytrix variabilis is a species of flowering plant in the myrtle family Myrtaceae and is endemic to the south-west of Western Australia. It is a shrub with glabrous branchlets, linear to lance-shaped or egg-shaped leaves and pink, mauve or purple flowers with about 25 to 90 stamens in several rows.

== Description ==
Calytrix variabilis is a shrub that typically grows to a height of 1 m (3 ft 3 in) with glabrous branchlets, usually growing from the tips of the flowering stems. Its leaves are linear to lance-shaped or egg-shaped, 1–12 mm (0.039–0.472 in) long and 0.6–2 mm (0.024–0.079 in) wide on a petiole 0.1–0.75 mm (0.0039–0.0295 in) long, with stipules up to 1 mm (0.039 in) long at the base of the petiole. The flowers are on a spindle-shaped or narrowly funnel-shaped peduncle 6–12 mm (0.24–0.47 in) long with egg-shaped to elliptic lobes 3–7.5 mm (0.12–0.30 in) long. The floral tube is spindle-shaped, 7–14 mm (0.28–0.55 in) long and has ten ribs. The sepals are more or less round to egg-shaped with the narrower end towards the base, 1.0–2.6 mm (0.039–0.102 in) long, 1.5–3.25 mm (0.059–0.128 in) wide with an awn up to 16 mm (0.63 in) long. The petals are pink, mauve or purple with a yellow base and there are about 25 to 90 stamens, the filaments the same colour as the petals, in two, three or four rows. Flowering occurs between July and December, mainly from September to November.

== Taxonomy ==
Calytrix variabilis was first formally described in 1839 by the botanist John Lindley in A Sketch of the Vegetation of the Swan River Colony. The specific epithet (variabilis) means 'variable'.

== Distribution and habitat ==
This species of Calytrix occurs from the Badgingarra district to the Darling Range east of Perth in the Geraldton Sandplains, Jarrah Forest and Swan Coastal Plain bioregions of south-western Western Australia where it grows on lateritic soils.

== Conservation status ==
Calytrix variabilis is listed as "not threatened" by the Government of Western Australia Department of Biodiversity, Conservation and Attractions.
