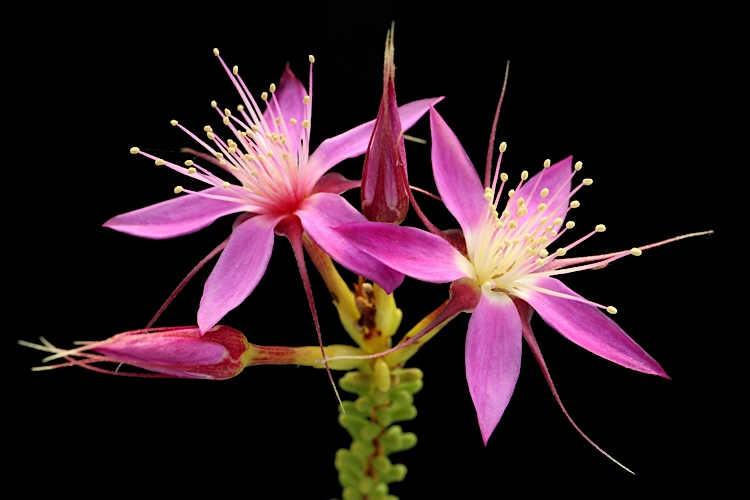
- In the Australian National Botanic Gardens

Scientific classification
- Kingdom: Plantae
- Clade: Tracheophytes
- Clade: Angiosperms
- Clade: Eudicots
- Clade: Rosids
- Order: Myrtales
- Family: Myrtaceae
- Genus: Calytrix
- Species: C. desolata

Binomial name
- Calytrix desolata S.Moore

Synonyms
- Calythrix desolata S.Moore orth. var.

= Calytrix desolata =

Species of flowering plant

Calytrix desolata is a species of flowering plant in the myrtle family Myrtaceae and is endemic to the western regions of Western Australia. It is a glabrous shrub with linear oblong or lance-shaped leaves with the narrower end towards the base, and pink to purple flowers with about 30 to 60 stamens in several rows.

== Description ==
Calytrix desolata is a glabrous shrub that typically grows to a height of up to 0.2–1.3 m (7.9 in – 4 ft 3.2 in). Its leaves are linear, oblong or lance-shaped with the narrower end towards the base, 1–5 mm (0.039–0.197 in) long, 0.5–1.0 mm (0.020–0.039 in) wide, on a petiole up to 0.25–0.75 mm (0.0098–0.0295 in) long. There are stipule up to 0.5 mm (0.020 in) long at the base of the petioles. The flowers are borne on a peduncle 4–7 mm (0.16–0.28 in) long. The floral tube is 8–12 mm (0.31–0.47 in) long, has 10 ribs and is free from the style. The sepals are joined for a short distance at the base, the lobes broadly elliptic to almost round, 1.5–2.0 mm (0.059–0.079 in) long and 1.75–2.4 mm (0.069–0.094 in) wide with an awn up to 12.5 mm (0.49 in) long. The petals are pink, deep pink, mauve-pink or purple, lance-shaped to narrowly elliptic, 7.5–11.5 mm (0.30–0.45 in) long and 2.25–3.00 mm (0.089–0.118 in) wide. There are about 30 to 60 pinkish red stamens 2.0–7.5 mm (0.079–0.295 in) long, becoming reddish as they age. Flowering usually occurs from September to November.

== Taxonomy ==
Calytrix desolata was first formally described in 1898 by Spencer Le Marchant Moore in the Journal of the Linnean Society, Botany.

== Distribution and habitat ==
This species of Calytrix is found on plains, rises and creekbeds in the Carnarvon, Gascoyne, Great Victoria Desert, Murchison and Yalgoo bioregions of Western Australia where it grows on sandy soils over weathered granite.
