= Calytrix uncinata =

Scientific classification
- Kingdom: Plantae
- Clade: Tracheophytes
- Clade: Angiosperms
- Clade: Eudicots
- Clade: Rosids
- Order: Myrtales
- Family: Myrtaceae
- Genus: Calytrix
- Species: C. uncinata

Binomial name
- Calytrix uncinata Craven

Species of flowering plant

Calytrix uncinata is a species of flowering plant in the myrtle family Myrtaceae and is endemic to inland areas of Western Australia. It is a shrub that typically grows to a height of 0.5–1 m (1 ft 8 in – 3 ft 3 in), has white, star-shaped flowers between August and November.

This species was first formally described in 1990 by Lyndley Craven in the journal Australian Systematic Botany from specimens collected near the Teutonic townsite in 1981.

Calytrix uncinata grows on granite or sandstone breakaways and rocky rises in the Murchison and Yalgoo bioregions of inland western Australia. It is listed as "not threatened" by the Government of Western Australia Department of Biodiversity, Conservation and Attractions.
