= Calytrix divergens =

Scientific classification
- Kingdom: Plantae
- Clade: Tracheophytes
- Clade: Angiosperms
- Clade: Eudicots
- Clade: Rosids
- Order: Myrtales
- Family: Myrtaceae
- Genus: Calytrix
- Species: C. divergens

Binomial name
- Calytrix divergens Craven

Species of flowering plant

Calytrix divergens is a species of flowering plant in the myrtle family Myrtaceae and is endemic to inland areas of Western Australia. It is a mostly glabrous shrub with egg-shaped, lance-shaped or oblong leaves, and yellow flowers with about 40 to 80 stamens in several rows.

== Description ==
Calytrix divergens is a mostly glabrous shrub that typically grows to a height of up to 20–60 cm (7.9–23.6 in). Its leaves are egg-shaped, lance-shaped or oblong, 1–3 mm (0.039–0.118 in) long, 0.5–2.0 mm (0.020–0.079 in) wide and sessile or on a petiole up to 0.5 mm (0.020 in) long. The flowers are borne on a peduncle 7–10 mm (0.28–0.39 in) long. The floral tube is 8–14 mm (0.31–0.55 in) long, has 5 ribs. The sepals are joined for a short distance at the base, the lobes egg-shaped with the narrower end towards the base, 1.75–4.0 mm (0.069–0.157 in) long and 1.75–3.25 mm (0.069–0.128 in) wide with an awn up to 12 mm (0.47 in) long. The petals are yellow and elliptic, 4.5–8.5 mm (0.18–0.33 in) long and 2.5–5.0 mm (0.098–0.197 in) wide. There are about 40 to 80 yellow stamens 1–6 mm (0.039–0.236 in) long. Flowering occurs from August to October.

== Taxonomy ==
Calytrix divergens was first formally described in 1987 by Lyndley Craven in the journal Brunonia from specimens collected 71 km (44 mi) south-east of Mileura in 1957. The specific epithet (divergens) means 'differing from', possibly referring to the leaves.

== Distribution and habitat ==
This species of Calytrix grows on breakaways and escarpments in the upper Murchison River district and south-eastwards to near Paynes Find where it grows on sandy soils over laterite, quartzite or granite in the Murchison and Yalgoo bioregions of inland Western Australia.
