= Calytrix platycheiridia =

Conservation status
- Priority Two — Poorly Known Taxa (DEC)

Scientific classification
- Kingdom: Plantae
- Clade: Tracheophytes
- Clade: Angiosperms
- Clade: Eudicots
- Clade: Rosids
- Order: Myrtales
- Family: Myrtaceae
- Genus: Calytrix
- Species: C. platycheiridia

Binomial name
- Calytrix platycheiridia Craven

Species of flowering plant

Calytrix platycheiridia is a species of flowering plant in the myrtle family Myrtaceae and is endemic to a restricted area in the south-west of Western Australia. It is a shrub with egg-shaped leaves and cream-coloured flowers with about 35 to 50 yellow stamens in several rows.

== Description ==
Calytrix platycheiridia is a glabrous shrub that typically grows to a height of up to 45 cm (18 in). Its leaves are overlapping to closely spaced, egg-shaped, 1.5–4.5 mm (0.059–0.177 in) long and 1.0–2.5 mm (0.039–0.098 in) wide and sessile or on a petiole up to 0.25 mm (0.0098 in) long. The flowers are borne on a flattened peduncle 3.5–5 mm (0.14–0.20 in) long with lobes 1.5–3 mm (0.059–0.118 in) long. The floral tube is 2.75–4.0 mm (0.108–0.157 in) long, 0.8–1.0 mm (0.031–0.039 in) wide with eight to ten ribs. The sepals are oblong, 0.3–0.5 mm (0.012–0.020 in) long and 0.7–0.9 mm (0.028–0.035 in) wide. The petals are cream-coloured with a yellow base, egg-shaped to elliptic, 4.25–5.0 mm (0.167–0.197 in) long and 2.25–3.0 mm (0.089–0.118 in) wide, and there are about 35 to 50 yellow stamens in two or three rows. Flowering occurs in October.

== Taxonomy ==
Calytrix platycheiridia was first formally described in 1987 by Lyndley Craven in the journal Brunonia from specimens collected west of Coorow in 1981. The specific epithet (platycheiridia) means 'wide- or broad-glove', referring to the bracteoles.

== Distribution and habitat ==
This species of Calytrix grows sandy soils on low ridges in the Coorow-Watheroo district.

== Conservation status ==
Calytrix platycheiridia is listed as "Priority Two" by the Government of Western Australia Department of Biodiversity, Conservation and Attractions, meaning that it is poorly known and from one or a few locations.
