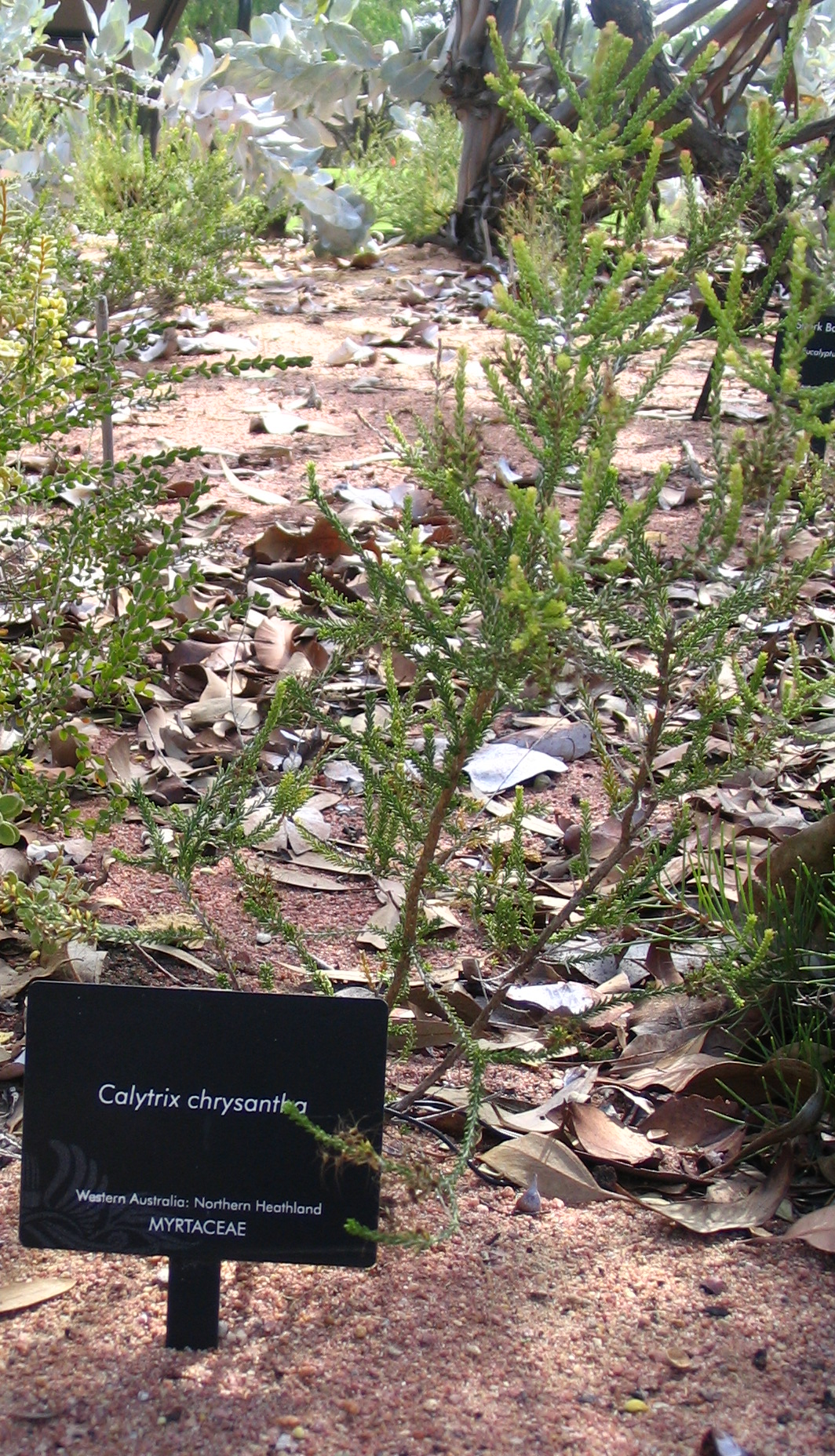
- Calytrix chrysantha at Kings Park

Conservation status
- Priority Four — Rare Taxa (DEC)

Scientific classification
- Kingdom: Plantae
- Clade: Tracheophytes
- Clade: Angiosperms
- Clade: Eudicots
- Clade: Rosids
- Order: Myrtales
- Family: Myrtaceae
- Genus: Calytrix
- Species: C. chrysantha

Binomial name
- Calytrix chrysantha Craven

= Calytrix chrysantha =

Species of flowering plant

Calytrix chrysantha is a species of flowering plant in the myrtle family Myrtaceae and is endemic to the south-west of Western Australia. It is a glabrous shrub usually with oblong to linear leaves and clusters of yellow flowers with about 45 to 55 yellow stamens in several rows.

== Description ==
Calytrix chrysantha is a glabrous shrub that typically grows to a height of up to 0.3–1.33 m (1 ft 0 in – 4 ft 4 in). Its leaves are oblong to linear, 1.25–4 mm (0.049–0.157 in) long, 1.0–1.25 mm (0.039–0.049 in) wide on a petiole 0.2–0.75 mm (0.0079–0.0295 in) long. There are stipules up to 0.25 mm (0.0098 in) long at the base of the petioles. The floral tube is 7.5–10 mm (0.30–0.39 in) long and has 10 to 12 ribs. The sepals are joined for up to 0.3 mm (0.012 in) at the base, the lobes broadly egg-shaped with the narrower end towards the base, 1.5–1.76 mm (0.059–0.069 in) long and wide with an awn up to 10 mm (0.39 in) long. The petals are yellow, egg-shaped to lance-shaped, 6.5–7.0 mm (0.26–0.28 in) long and 2.75–3.5 mm (0.108–0.138 in) wide with 45 to 55 yellow stamens with filaments 2.0–6.5 mm (0.079–0.256 in) long. Flowering occurs from December or January to February.

== Taxonomy ==
Calytrix chrysantha was first formally described in 1987 by Lyndley Craven in the journal Brunonia from specimens collected about 7 km (4.3 mi) south of the rail crossing on Eneabba South Road in 1978. The specific epithet (chrysantha) means 'gold-flowered'.

== Distribution and habitat ==
This species of Calytrix is found on flats in the Eneabba district in the Avon Wheatbelt and Geraldton Sandplains bioregions of south-western Western Australia.

== Conservation status ==
This star flower is listed as "Priority Four" by the Government of Western Australia Department of Biodiversity, Conservation and Attractions, meaning that is rare or near threatened.
