= Calytrix sagei =

Conservation status
- Priority Two — Poorly Known Taxa (DEC)

Scientific classification
- Kingdom: Plantae
- Clade: Tracheophytes
- Clade: Angiosperms
- Clade: Eudicots
- Clade: Rosids
- Order: Myrtales
- Family: Myrtaceae
- Genus: Calytrix
- Species: C. sagei

Binomial name
- Calytrix sagei Rye

Species of flowering plant

Calytrix sagei is a species of flowering plant in the myrtle family Myrtaceae and is endemic to a restricted area in the south-west of Western Australia. It is a shrub with narrowly oblong to egg-shaped leaves with the narrower end towards the base, and yellow or cream-coloured flowers with about 15 to 25 stamens in several rows.

== Description ==
Calytrix sagei is a shrub that typically grows to a height of 20–40 cm (7.9–15.7 in). Its leaves are narrowly oblong to egg-shaped with the narrower end towards the base, 2.5–3.5 mm (0.098–0.138 in) long, 0.9–1.5 mm (0.035–0.059 in) wide and usually 0.5–0.7 mm (0.020–0.028 in) thick. There are stipules up to 0.4 mm (0.016 in) long at the base of young leaves. The flowers are borne on a peduncle 0.5–0.8 mm (0.020–0.031 in) long with spatula-shaped bracteoles 4.5–6.0 mm (0.18–0.24 in) long. The floral tube is 8.0–10.5 mm (0.31–0.41 in) long and has five to ten ribs. The sepals are 4.0–4.5 mm (0.16–0.18 in) long with an awn 8–19 mm (0.31–0.75 in) long. The petals are yellow or cream-coloured and there are 15 to 25 stamens in two or more rows. Flowering has been recorded in October and November.

== Taxonomy ==
Calytrix sagei was first formally described in 2013 by Barbara Lynette Rye in the journal Nuytsia from specimens collected north-east of Pingelly in 1998. The specific epithet (sagei) honours Leigh Sage, who was a joint collector of the type specimens, and who worked extensively on the taxonomy of the Goodeniaceae.

== Distribution and habitat ==
This species of Calytrix grows in a range of habitats, including on the edges of salt lake and in sandy clay between Beverley and near Narembeen in the Avon Wheatbelt bioregion of south-western Western Australia.

== Conservation status ==
Calytrix sagei is listed as "Priority Two" by the Government of Western Australia Department of Biodiversity, Conservation and Attractions, meaning that it is poorly known and from one or a few locations.
