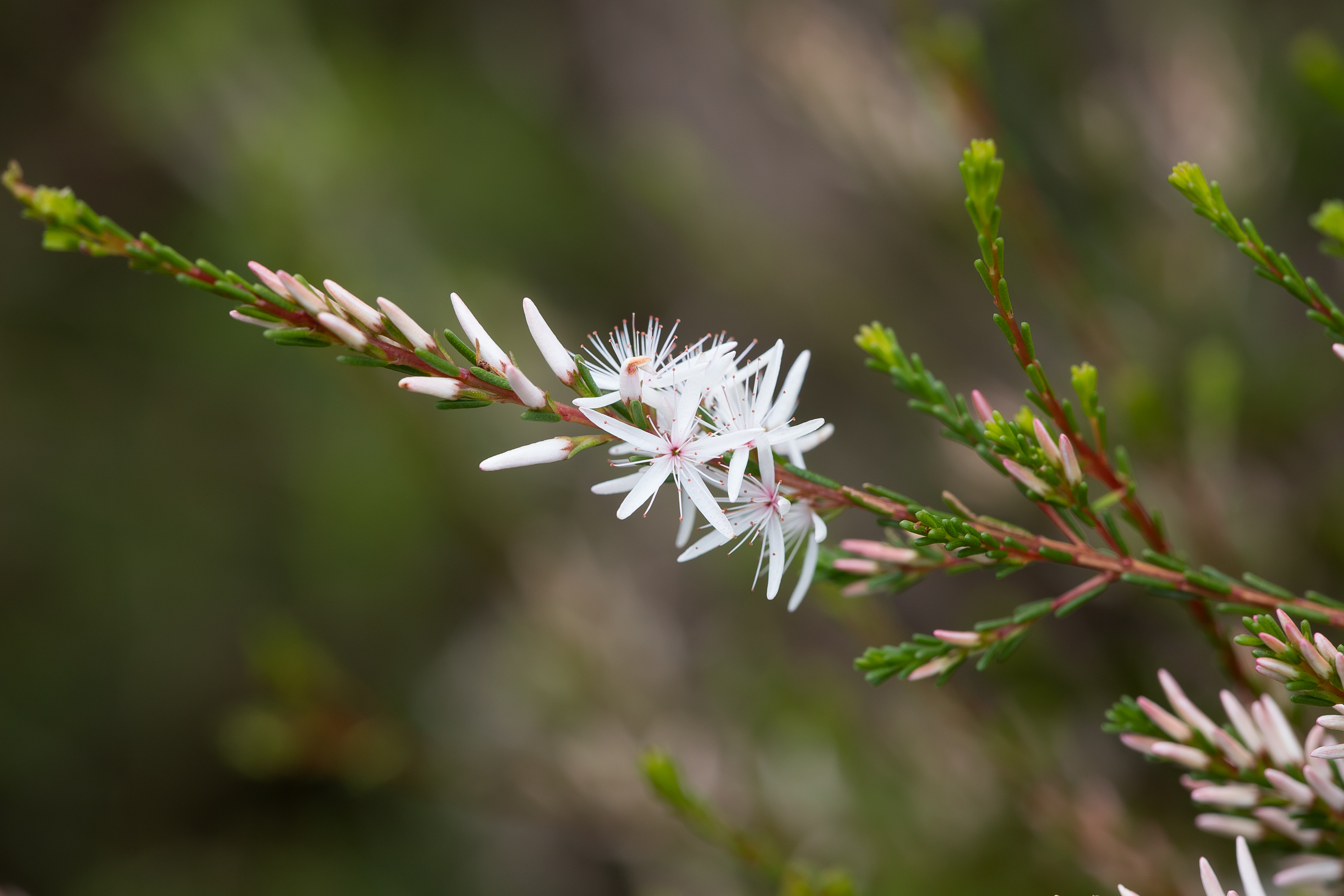
- In Cox Scrub Conservation Park

Scientific classification
- Kingdom: Plantae
- Clade: Tracheophytes
- Clade: Angiosperms
- Clade: Eudicots
- Clade: Rosids
- Order: Myrtales
- Family: Myrtaceae
- Genus: Calytrix
- Species: C. glaberrima

Binomial name
- Calytrix glaberrima (F.Muell.) Craven

Synonyms
- List: Calytrix sp. A; Calytrix sp. A; Lhotskya glaberrima F.Muell.; Lhotskya glaberrima F.Muell. var. glaberrima; Lhotskya glaberrima var. magnisepala J.M.Black; Lhotzkya glaberrima F.Muell. orth. var.; Lhotzkya glaberrima F.Muell. var. glaberrima orth. var.; Lhotzkya glaberrima var. magnisepala J.M.Black orth. var.

= Calytrix glaberrima =

Species of flowering plant

Calytrix glaberrima, commonly known as smooth fringe-myrtle, is a species of flowering plant in the myrtle family Myrtaceae and is endemic to the south of South Australia. It is a woody, glabrous shrub with elliptic, linear or egg-shaped leaves and clusters of white to pink flowers with 20 to 30 white stamens in a single row.

== Description ==
Calytrix glaberrima is a glabrous shrub that typically grows to a height of up to 1.3 m (4 ft 3 in). Its leaves are spreading to erect, elliptic, linear or egg-shaped, 1–4 mm (0.039–0.157 in) long and 0.2–0.5 mm (0.0079–0.0197 in) wide on a petiole 0.2–0.5 mm (0.0079–0.0197 in) long. There are stipules up to 0.2 mm (0.0079 in) long at the base of the petioles. The flowers are borne on a peduncle 0.5–0.75 mm (0.020–0.030 in) long with egg-shaped to narrowly egg-shaped bracteoles 1.5–2.75 mm (0.059–0.108 in) at the base. The floral tube has 10 ribs and is 1.5–2.5 mm (0.059–0.098 in) long and free from the style. The sepals are free from each other, egg-shaped to more or less round, 0.6–2 mm (0.024–0.079 in) long and 0.6–1.3 mm (0.024–0.051 in) wide. The petals are white to pink, elliptic to narrowly elliptic or lance-shaped, 3.5–6.5 mm (0.14–0.26 in) long and 1.5–2.0 mm (0.059–0.079 in) wide and there are about 20 to 30 white stamens in a single row. Flowering from October to April.

== Taxonomy ==
This species was first described in 1858 by Ferdinand von Mueller who gave it the name Lhotskya glaberrima in his Fragmenta Phytographiae Australiae from specimens collected on Kangaroo Island. In 1987, Lyndley Craven transferred the species to Calytrix as C. glaberrima in the journal Brunonia. The specific epithet (glaberrima) means 'wholly glabrous'.

== Distribution and habitat ==
Calytrix glaberrima grows in heathy scrub on sand and ridges on the southern Mount Lofty Range and on Kangaroo Island in the south of South Australia.
