= Calytrix parvivallis =

Conservation status
- Priority Two — Poorly Known Taxa (DEC)

Scientific classification
- Kingdom: Plantae
- Clade: Tracheophytes
- Clade: Angiosperms
- Clade: Eudicots
- Clade: Rosids
- Order: Myrtales
- Family: Myrtaceae
- Genus: Calytrix
- Species: C. parvivallis

Binomial name
- Calytrix parvivallis Craven

Species of flowering plant

Calytrix parvivallis is a species of flowering plant in the myrtle family Myrtaceae and is endemic a restricted area in the south-west of Western Australia. It is a shrub with decussate, narrowly elliptic leaves and purple flowers with about 45 to 50 stamens in three rows.

== Description ==
Calytrix parvivallis is a shrub that typically grows to a height of 50 cm (20 in). Its leaves are decussate, overlapping to closely spaced and pressed against the stem, narrowly elliptic, 2–3 mm (0.079–0.118 in) long and 0.5–0.8 mm (0.020–0.031 in) wide and sessile. There are stipules up to 0.75 mm (0.030 in) long at the base of the leaves. The flowers are borne on a hairy, funnel-shaped peduncle 3.4–4.0 mm (0.13–0.16 in) long with egg-shaped to more or less round lobes 2.3–2.5 mm (0.091–0.098 in) long. The floral tube is hairy, 3.0–3.5 mm (0.12–0.14 in) long, 0.75–1.0 mm (0.030–0.039 in) wide, and narrowly cone-shaped with 10 ribs. The sepals are hairy, fused at the base, with more or less round to elliptic lobes 1.25–1.50 mm (0.049–0.059 in) long and 1.50–1.75 mm (0.059–0.069 in) wide. The petals are purple, glabrous, elliptic to egg-shaped, mostly 5.0–6.5 mm (0.20–0.26 in) long and 2.75–3.25 mm (0.108–0.128 in) wide, and there are about 45 to 50 stamens in three rows. Flowering occurs in October.

== Taxonomy ==
Calytrix parvivallis was first formally described in 1987 by Lyndley Craven in the journal Brunonia from specimens collected near Minnivale, east of Dowerin in 1963. The specific epithet (parvivallis) means 'small valley', a translation of the type location.

== Distribution and habitat ==
This species of Calytrix grows on sand and red loam in the Minnivale district, in the Avon Wheatbelt bioregion of south-western Western Australia.

== Conservation status ==
Calytrix parvivallis is listed as "Priority Two" by the Government of Western Australia Department of Biodiversity, Conservation and Attractions, meaning that it is poorly known and from one or a few locations.
