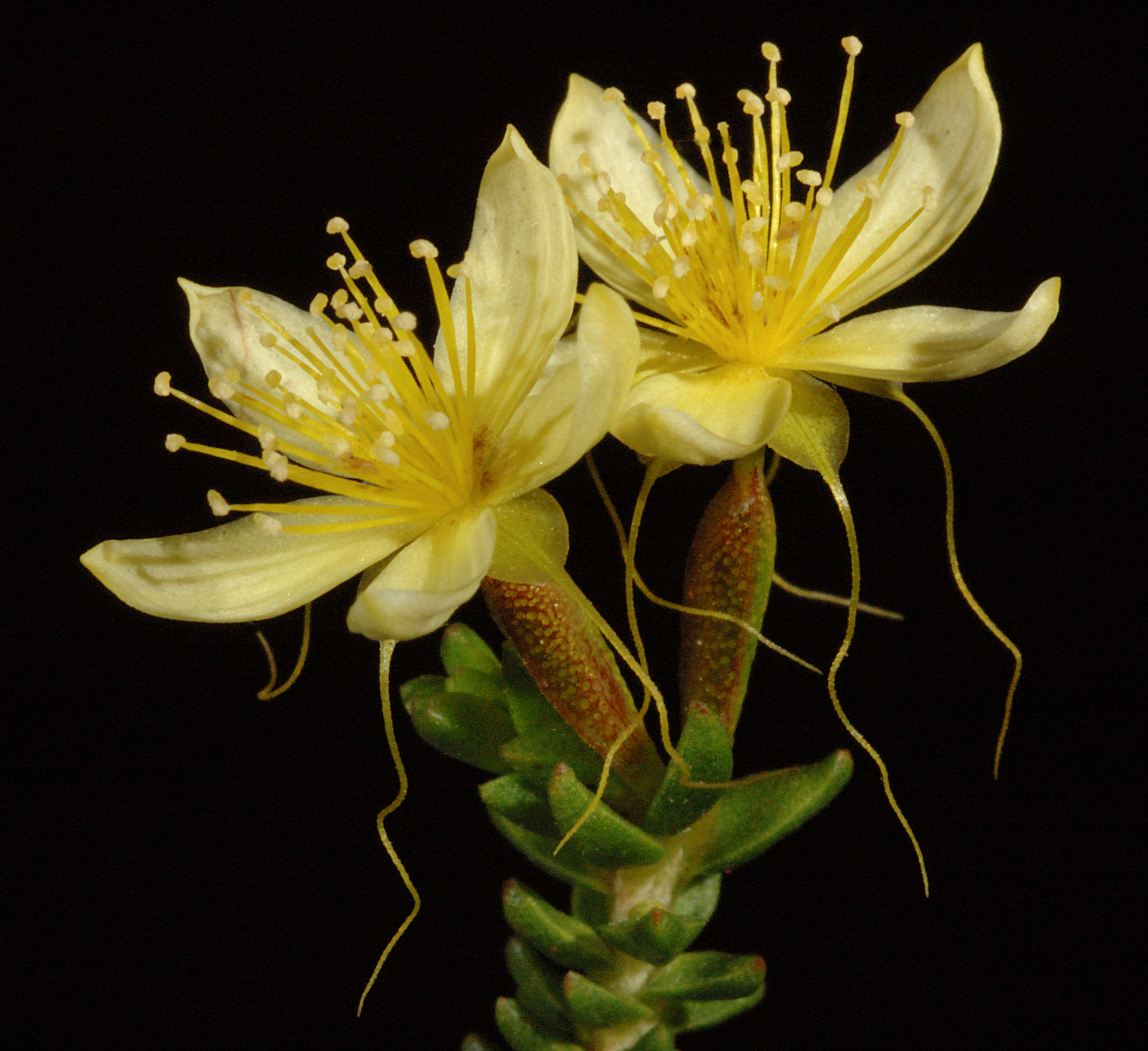

Scientific classification
- Kingdom: Plantae
- Clade: Tracheophytes
- Clade: Angiosperms
- Clade: Eudicots
- Clade: Rosids
- Order: Myrtales
- Family: Myrtaceae
- Genus: Calytrix
- Species: C. angulata

Binomial name
- Calytrix angulata Lindl.

Synonyms
- Calycothrix angulata (Lindl.) Schauer; Calythrix angulata Benth. orth. var.

= Calytrix angulata =

Species of flowering plant

Calytrix angulata, commonly known as yellow starflower, is a species of flowering plant in the myrtle family Myrtaceae and is endemic to the south-west of Western Australia. It is a shrub with linear to egg-shaped leaves and clusters of yellowish-cream coloured flowers with 30 to 40 yellow stamens in several rows.

== Description ==
Calytrix angulata is a shrub that typically grows to a height of 0.2–1 m (7.9 in – 3 ft 3.4 in), and has linear to egg-shaped leaves 2–7 mm (0.079–0.276 in) long, 0.75–2.5 mm (0.030–0.098 in) wide and sessile or on a petiole up to 0.3 mm (0.012 in) long. There no stipules. The flowers are arranged singly in leaf axils, the floral tube more or less spindle-shaped with 10 ribs and 6.5–11 mm (0.26–0.43 in) long. The sepals are joined at the base, 1.25–2 mm (0.049–0.079 in) long with an awn up to 12 mm (0.47 in) long. The petals are creamy-yellow, lance-shaped to narrowly elliptic, 5.5–8 mm (0.22–0.31 in) long and 2–3 mm (0.079–0.118 in) wide and there are about 30 to 40 yellow stamens in 3 rows. Flowering occurs between August and December or January.

== Taxonomy ==
Calytrix angulata was first formally described in 1839 by John Lindley in his A Sketch of the Vegetation of the Swan River Colony. The specific epithet (angulata) means "angular", referring to the branchlets.

== Distribution and habitat ==
Yellow starflower is commonly found on plains and slopes in the Avon Wheatbelt, Esperance Plains, Geraldton Sandplains, Jarrah Forest and Swan Coastal Plain bioregions of south-western Western Australia, where it grows in sandy soils.
