= Calytrix birdii =

Scientific classification
- Kingdom: Plantae
- Clade: Tracheophytes
- Clade: Angiosperms
- Clade: Eudicots
- Clade: Rosids
- Order: Myrtales
- Family: Myrtaceae
- Genus: Calytrix
- Species: C. birdii

Binomial name
- Calytrix birdii (F.Muell.) B.D.Jacks.

Synonyms
- Calycothrix birdii F.Muell.; Calythrix birdii B.D.Jacks. orth. var.

Species of flowering plant

Calytrix birdii is a species of flowering plant in the myrtle family Myrtaceae and is endemic to inland areas of Western Australia. It is a shrub with egg-shaped to more or less round leaves and clusters of purple flowers with 45 to 55 reddish-purple stamens in several rows.

== Description ==
Calytrix birdii is a glabrous shrub that typically grows to a height of 30–60 cm (12–24 in). Its leaves are egg-shaped with the narrower end towards the base, to more or less round, 1–3.5 mm (0.039–0.138 in) long and 0.75–1.3 mm (0.030–0.051 in) wide on a petiole 0.3–0.75 mm (0.012–0.030 in) long. There is a stipule up to 0.3 mm (0.012 in) long at the base of the petiole. The flowers are arranged singly or in small clusters. The floral tube has 10 ribs and tightly surrounds the style that is 8–11.5 mm (0.31–0.45 in) long. The sepals are joined at the base with more or less round blades 1.5–2 mm (0.059–0.079 in) long and 2.0–2.4 mm (0.079–0.094 in) wide with an awn up to 14 mm (0.55 in) long. The petals are purple, egg-shaped, 6.75–8.5 mm (0.266–0.335 in) long and 3.5–4.25 mm (0.138–0.167 in) wide, and there are 45 to 55 reddish-purple stamens in 4 rows. Flowering occurs from September to November.

== Taxonomy ==
This species was first formally described by Ferdinand von Mueller who gave it the name Calycothrix birdii in his Fragmenta Phytographiae Australiae from specimens collected by Jess Young. In 1893, Benjamin Daydon Jackson transferred the species to the genus Calytrix as C. birdii in Index Kewensis. The specific epithet (birdii) honours Samuel Dougan Bird, a lecturer in medicine at the University of Melbourne.

== Distribution and habitat ==
Calytrix birdii grows in sand on sandplains in open spinifex heath and mallees in the Coolgardie and Murchison bioregions of inland Western Australia.
