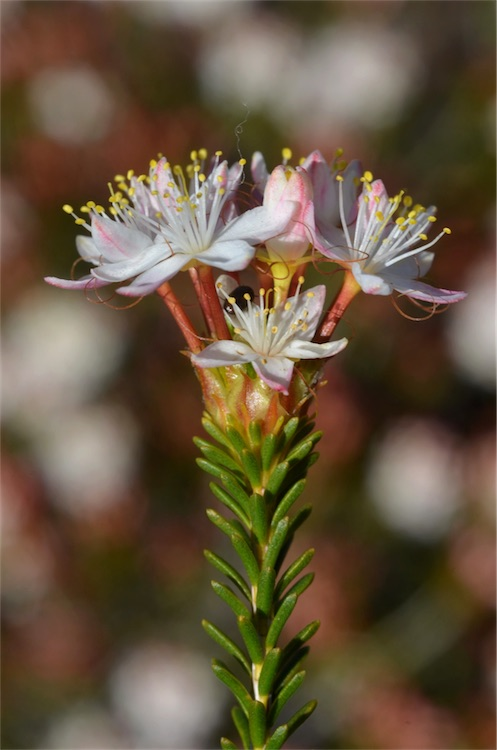

Scientific classification
- Kingdom: Plantae
- Clade: Tracheophytes
- Clade: Angiosperms
- Clade: Eudicots
- Clade: Rosids
- Order: Myrtales
- Family: Myrtaceae
- Genus: Calytrix
- Species: C. involucrata

Binomial name
- Calytrix involucrata J.M.Black

Synonyms
- Calythrix involucrata J.M.Black orth. var.

= Calytrix involucrata =

Species of flowering plant

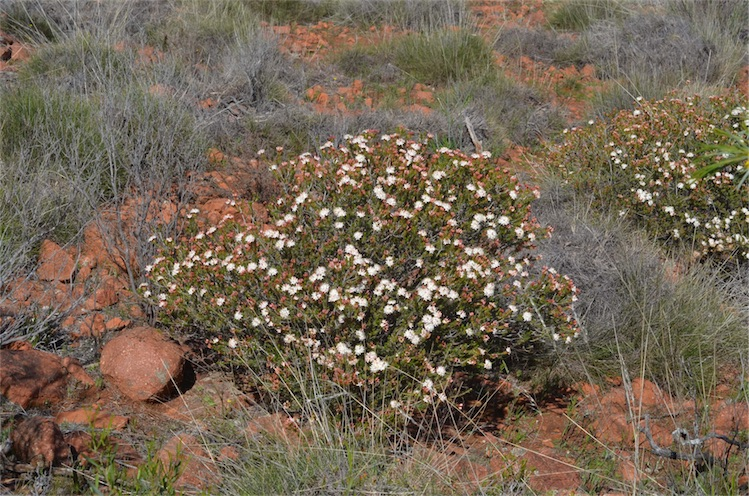
Habit in the Gawler Ranges National Park

Calytrix involucrata, commonly known as cup fringe-myrtle, is a species of flowering plant in the myrtle family Myrtaceae and is endemic to the south of South Australia. It is a glabrous shrub with linear to elliptic leaves and clusters of white flowers sometimes tinged with pink, with 17 to 25 white stamens in a single row.

== Description ==
Calytrix involucrata is a glabrous shrub that typically grows to a height of up to 1 m (3 ft 3 in). Its leaves are spreading to erect, linear to elliptic, 1.75–7.5 mm (0.069–0.295 in) long and 0.7–125 mm (0.028–4.921 in) wide on a petiole 0.4–1 mm (0.016–0.039 in) long. There are stipules up to 0.3 mm (0.012 in) long at the base of the petioles. The flowers are borne in tight clusters with egg-shaped bracts up to 10 mm (0.39 in) long and 5.5 mm (0.22 in) wide on a peduncle 5.5–8 mm (0.22–0.31 in) long with elliptic lobes 3–6 mm (0.12–0.24 in) long. The floral tube has 10 ribs and is 8–12 mm (0.31–0.47 in) long. The sepals are joined at the base, broadly egg-shaped with the narrower end towards the base, 1.0–1.75 mm (0.039–0.069 in) long and 1.75–2.5 mm (0.069–0.098 in) wide with awns up to 12 mm (0.47 in) long. The petals are white, sometimes with a pink tinge, egg-shaped to elliptic, 4.5–7 mm (0.18–0.28 in) long and 2.0–3.5 mm (0.079–0.138 in) wide, and there are 17 to 25 white stamens in a single row. Flowering occurs from August to October.

== Taxonomy ==
Calytrix involucrata was first described in 1928 by John McConnell Black in the Transactions and Proceedings of the Royal Society of South Australia. The specific epithet (involucrata) means 'involucrate', or having a ring or rings of bracts around the base of the flowers.

== Distribution and habitat ==
This species of Calytrix grows in mallee scrub on sand, mainly in the Eyre and Yorke Peninsulas of South Australia.
