= Calytrix eneabbensis =

Conservation status
- Priority Four — Rare Taxa (DEC)

Scientific classification
- Kingdom: Plantae
- Clade: Tracheophytes
- Clade: Angiosperms
- Clade: Eudicots
- Clade: Rosids
- Order: Myrtales
- Family: Myrtaceae
- Genus: Calytrix
- Species: C. eneabbensis

Binomial name
- Calytrix eneabbensis Craven

Species of flowering plant

Calytrix eneabbensis is a species of flowering plant in the myrtle family Myrtaceae and is endemic to the south-west of Western Australia. It is a glabrous shrub with lance-shaped leaves and purple and yellowish flowers with 40 to 60 stamens in several rows.

== Description ==
Calytrix eneabbensis is a glabrous shrub that typically grows to a height of 50 cm (20 in) and has lance-shaped leaves that are 3.5–10.5 mm (0.14–0.41 in) long and 1–2 mm (0.039–0.079 in) wide on a petiole 0.4–1.5 mm (0.016–0.059 in) long. The flowers are borne in clusters of a few to many on a peduncle 8–9 mm (0.31–0.35 in) long with lobes 4.5–6.0 mm (0.18–0.24 in) long. The floral tube is 19–13 mm (0.75–0.51 in) long, has 10 ribs. The sepals are joined at the base, egg-shaped with the narrower end towards the base, 1.5–2.1 mm (0.059–0.083 in) long. The petals are purple with a yellowish base, lance-shaped, 7.0–9.5 mm (0.28–0.37 in) long and 3.0–3.75 mm (0.118–0.148 in) wide. There are 40 to 60 yellow stamens 1.25–6.0 mm (0.049–0.236 in) long in several rows. Flowering occurs from July to October.

== Taxonomy ==
Calytrix eneabbensis was first formally described in 1987 by Lyndley Craven in the journal Brunonia from specimens collected on the Lake Indoon road near Eneabba in 1981. The specific epithet (eneabbensis) means 'native of Eneabba'.

== Distribution and habitat ==
This species of Calytrix grows in heath on sand and on sandplains in the Eneabba district, in the Geraldton Sandplains bioregion in the southwest of Western Australia.

== Conservation status ==
Calytrix eneabbensis is listed as "Priority Four" by the Government of Western Australia Department of Biodiversity, Conservation and Attractions, meaning that is rare or near threatened.
