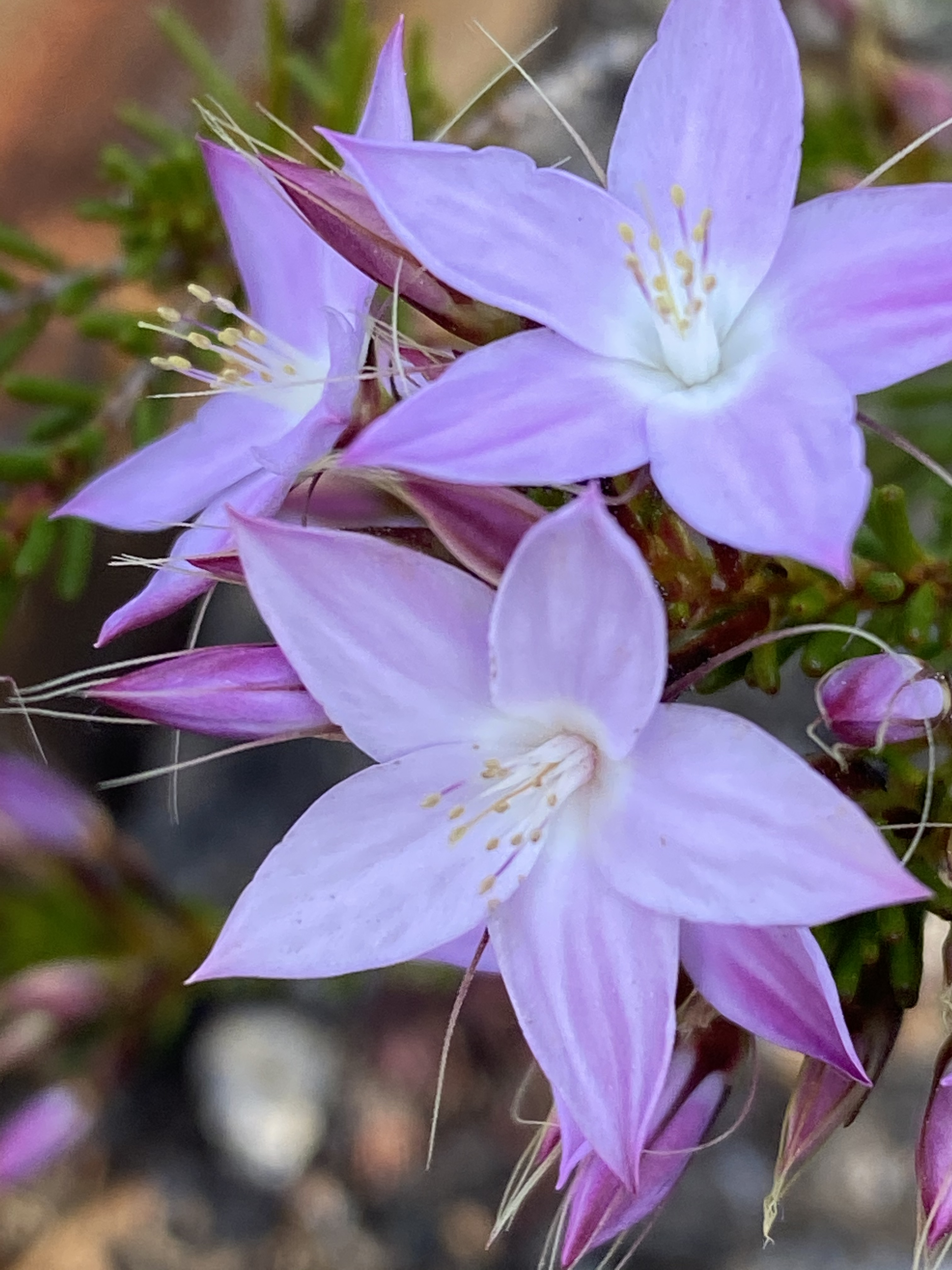

Scientific classification
- Kingdom: Plantae
- Clade: Tracheophytes
- Clade: Angiosperms
- Clade: Eudicots
- Clade: Rosids
- Order: Myrtales
- Family: Myrtaceae
- Genus: Calytrix
- Species: C. glutinosa

Binomial name
- Calytrix glutinosa Lindl.

= Calytrix glutinosa =

Species of flowering plant

Calytrix glutinosa is a species of flowering plant in the myrtle family Myrtaceae and is endemic to the south-west of Western Australia. It is a more or less glabrous shrub with linear leaves and clusters of pink to mauve flowers with about 10 to 20 white stamens in one or two rows, becoming reddish-purple as they age.

== Description ==
Calytrix glutinosa is a glabrous shrub that typically grows to a height of up to 1 m (3 ft 3 in). Its leaves are spreading to erect, linear, 3–15 mm (0.12–0.59 in) long and 0.8–1.1 mm (0.031–0.043 in) wide on a petiole 0.5–1 mm (0.020–0.039 in) long. There are no stipules. The peduncle is 9–17 mm (0.35–0.67 in) long with egg-shaped to lance-shaped lobes 3.5–6.5 mm (0.14–0.26 in) long. The floral tube is 10–14 mm (0.39–0.55 in) long, free from the style and has 5 ribs. The sepals are joined for up to 0.75 mm (0.030 in) at the base, the lobes more or less circular to broadly egg-shaped with the narrower end towards the base, 2.25–3.0 mm (0.089–0.118 in) long and 2.25–3.5 mm (0.089–0.138 in) wide with an awn up to 16 mm (0.63 in) long. The petals are pink to mauve with a white base, lance-shaped or elliptic, 9.0–12.5 mm (0.35–0.49 in) long and 3.75–5.5 mm (0.148–0.217 in) wide with about 10 to 20 white stamens in 1 or 2 rows, becoming reddish-purple as they age. Flowering occurs from August to December.

== Taxonomy ==
Calytrix glutinosa was first formally described in 1839 by John Lindley in A Sketch of the Vegetation of the Swan River Colony. The specific epithet (glutinosa) means 'sticky', referring to the peduncles.

== Distribution and habitat ==
This species of Calytrix grows on hillsides, granite outcrops and sandy ridges between the Northampton and Wubin district in the Avon Wheatbelt, Geraldton Sandplains, Jarrah Forest, Swan Coastal Plain and Yalgoo bioregions of south-western Western Australia.

== Conservation status ==
Calytrix glutinosa is listed as "not threatened" by the Government of Western Australia Department of Biodiversity, Conservation and Attractions.
