= Calytrix patrickiae =

Conservation status
- Priority Two — Poorly Known Taxa (DEC)

Scientific classification
- Kingdom: Plantae
- Clade: Tracheophytes
- Clade: Angiosperms
- Clade: Eudicots
- Clade: Rosids
- Order: Myrtales
- Family: Myrtaceae
- Genus: Calytrix
- Species: C. patrickiae

Binomial name
- Calytrix patrickiae Rye

Species of flowering plant

Calytrix patrickiae is a species of flowering plant in the myrtle family Myrtaceae and is endemic to a restricted area in the south-west of Western Australia. It is a spreading shrub with many branches, decussate, egg-shaped to narrowly oblong leaves and deep purple flowers with a yellow base, and about 30 to 40 stamens in several rows.

== Description ==
Calytrix patrickiae is a spreading shrub with many branches, and that typically grows to a height of 10–40 cm (3.9–15.7 in). Its leaves are decussate, egg-shaped to narrowly oblong, 3.0–4.5 mm (0.12–0.18 in) long, 0.6–1.2 mm (0.024–0.047 in) wide and 0.2–0.6 mm (0.0079–0.0236 in) thick. There are stipules up to 0.8 mm (0.031 in) long at the base of the leaves. The flowers are borne on a peduncle 0.5–0.8 mm (0.020–0.031 in) long with bracteoles 3–4.5 mm (0.12–0.18 in) long and fused at the base. The floral tube is 3.5–4.5 mm (0.14–0.18 in) long and has 10 ribs. The sepals are hairy, 3.0–4.5 mm (0.12–0.18 in) long and hairy with an awn 2–3 mm (0.079–0.118 in) long. The petals are deep to medium purple with a yellow base, sparsely hairy, 3.5–5 mm (0.14–0.20 in) long and there are about 30 to 40 stamens in two rows. Flowering has been recorded in September and October and the fruit is 0.50–0.75 mm (0.020–0.030 in) in diameter.

== Taxonomy ==
Calytrix patrickiae was first formally described in 2013 by Barbara Lynette Rye in the journal Nuytsia from specimens collected in Dragon Rocks Nature Reserve in 1991. The specific epithet (patrickiae) honours Sue Patrick, who conducted valuable surveys of Western Australian species with conservation priority and was a prolific illustrator of native plants.

== Distribution and habitat ==
This species of Calytrix grows on sand and sandy gravel in heathlands in the region north of Newdegate, in the Mallee bioregion of south-western Western Australia.

== Conservation status ==
Calytrix patrickiae is listed as "Priority Two" by the Government of Western Australia Department of Biodiversity, Conservation and Attractions, meaning that it is poorly known and from one or a few locations.
