= Calytrix rupestris =

Scientific classification
- Kingdom: Plantae
- Clade: Tracheophytes
- Clade: Angiosperms
- Clade: Eudicots
- Clade: Rosids
- Order: Myrtales
- Family: Myrtaceae
- Genus: Calytrix
- Species: C. rupestris

Binomial name
- Calytrix rupestris Craven

Species of flowering plant

Calytrix rupestris is a species of flowering plant in the myrtle family Myrtaceae and is endemic to the north of the Northern Territory. It is a shrub with linear to narrowly elliptic, or lance-shaped leaves with the narrower end towards the base, and white flowers with about 16 to 22 white stamens in a single row.

== Description ==
Calytrix rupestris is a shrub that typically grows to a height of up to 70 cm (28 in), its young branchlets covered with soft, white hairs. Its leaves are linear to narrowly elliptic, or lance-shaped with the narrower end towards the base, 2.5–3.0 mm (0.098–0.118 in) long and 0.5–0.6 mm (0.020–0.024 in) wide on a hairy petiole 0.2–0.6 mm (0.0079–0.0236 in) long. There are stipules up to 0.25 mm (0.0098 in) long at the base of the petiole. The flowers are borne on a peduncle 0.4–0.5 mm (0.016–0.020 in) long with egg-shaped bracteoles 1.5–2.5 mm (0.059–0.098 in) long. The floral tube is free from the style, 1.75–3.25 mm (0.069–0.128 in) long and has ten ribs. The sepals are fused at the base, with egg-shaped lobes 1.75–2.25 mm (0.069–0.089 in) long and 0.75–1.0 mm (0.030–0.039 in) wide. The petals are glabrous and white, elliptic to broadly elliptic, 1.8–2.5 mm (0.071–0.098 in) long and 1.25–1.4 mm (0.049–0.055 in) wide, and there are about 16 to 22 white stamens. Flowering occurs from March to June.

== Taxonomy ==
Calytrix rupestris was first formally described in 1980 by Lyndley Craven in the journal Brunonia from specimens he collected on Mount Brockman in Kakadu National Park in 1980. The specific epithet ("rupestris") means 'rocky'.

== Distribution and habitat ==
This species of Calytrix grows in crevices on dissected sandstone and on sandstone cliffs in the Arnhem Plateau and Pine Creek bioregions in the Northern Territory.

== Conservation status ==
Calytrix mimiana is listed as of "near threatened" under the Territory Parks and Wildlife Conservation Act.
