= Calytrix erosipetala =

Scientific classification
- Kingdom: Plantae
- Clade: Tracheophytes
- Clade: Angiosperms
- Clade: Eudicots
- Clade: Rosids
- Order: Myrtales
- Family: Myrtaceae
- Genus: Calytrix
- Species: C. erosipetala

Binomial name
- Calytrix erosipetala Craven

Species of flowering plant

Calytrix erosipetala is a species of flowering plant in the myrtle family Myrtaceae and is endemic to inland areas of Western Australia. It is a glabrous shrub with spreading lance-shaped to egg-shaped or linear leaves, and white to pink flowers with about 18 to 24 stamens in a single row.

== Description ==
Calytrix erosipetala is a glabrous shrub that typically grows to a height of 30–70 cm (12–28 in). Its leaves are lance-shaped or egg-shaped with the narrower end towards the base, or linear, 1.5–3.0 mm (0.059–0.118 in) long and 0.5–1 mm (0.020–0.039 in) wide on a petiole 0.25–1.0 mm (0.0098–0.0394 in) long. There are stipules up to 0.5 mm (0.020 in) long at the base of the petioles. The flowers are borne on a peduncle 1.5–2.0 mm (0.059–0.079 in) long and the floral tube is 10–12 mm (0.39–0.47 in) long, has 10 ribs. The sepals are joined for a short distance at the base, the lobes more or less round or egg-shaped with the narrower end towards the base, 1.75–2.0 mm (0.069–0.079 in) long and 2.5–2.8 mm (0.098–0.110 in) wide with an awn up to 18 mm (0.71 in) long. The petals are white, turning pink as the flowers open, broadly elliptic to egg-shaped with the narrower end towards the base, 5.5–6.0 mm (0.22–0.24 in) long and 3.5–3.8 mm (0.14–0.15 in) wide. There are about 18 to 24 white stamens 3.5–8.5 mm (0.14–0.33 in) long in a single row. Flowering occurs in September and October.

== Taxonomy ==
Calytrix erosipetala was first formally described in 1987 by Lyndley Craven in the journal Brunonia from specimens collected in the Meekatharra district in 1957. The specific epithet (erosipetala) means 'eroded petals'.

== Distribution and habitat ==
This species of Calytrix grows among granite breakaways in the Meekatharra and Lake Barlee district in the Murchison and Yalgoo bioregions of inland Western Australia.
