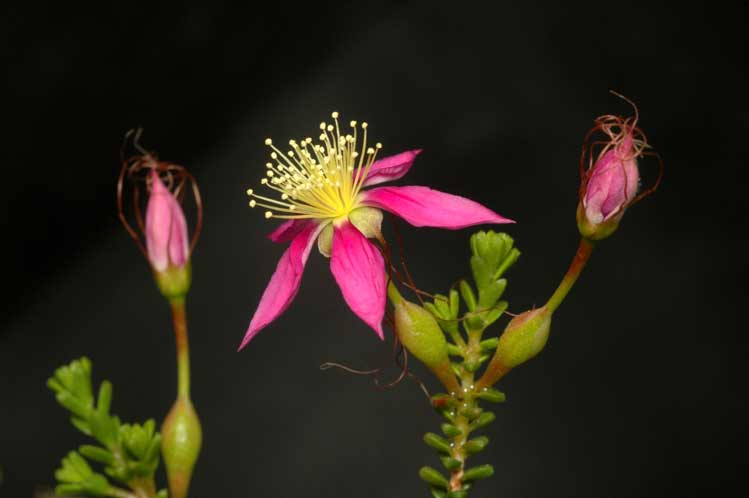
- In the Australian National Botanic Gardens

Scientific classification
- Kingdom: Plantae
- Clade: Tracheophytes
- Clade: Angiosperms
- Clade: Eudicots
- Clade: Rosids
- Order: Myrtales
- Family: Myrtaceae
- Genus: Calytrix
- Species: C. brevifolia

Binomial name
- Calytrix brevifolia (Meisn.) Benth.

= Calytrix brevifolia =

Species of flowering plant

Calytrix brevifolia is a species of flowering plant in the myrtle family Myrtaceae and is endemic to the west of Western Australia. It is a glabrous shrub with egg-shaped, linear, elliptic or more or less round leaves and clusters of pink to magenta flowers with about 40 to 90 yellow stamens in 4 rows.

== Description ==
Calytrix brevifolia is a glabrous shrub that typically grows to a height of up to 2.5 m (8 ft 2 in). Its leaves are egg-shaped, linear, elliptic or more or less round, 13–14 mm (0.51–0.55 in) long, 0.8–1.5 mm (0.031–0.059 in) wide and sessile or on a petiole up to 1.25 mm (0.049 in) long. There are stipules up to 0.3 mm (0.012 in) long at the base of the petioles. The floral tube is 12–23 mm (0.47–0.91 in) long, fused to the style and has 10 ribs. The sepals are joined for up to 0.5 mm (0.020 in) at the base, the lobes 1.5–3 mm (0.059–0.118 in) long with an awn up to 29 mm (1.1 in) long. The petals are pink to magenta with a yellow base, egg-shaped, lance-shaped or broadly elliptic, 8–11.5 mm (0.31–0.45 in) long and 4.0–6.5 mm (0.16–0.26 in) wide with 40 to 90 yellow stamens in 4 rows, each 2.5–8 mm (0.098–0.315 in) long. Flowering usually occurs from September to November.

== Taxonomy ==
This species was first formally described in 1857 by Carl Meissner who gave it the name Calycothrix brevifolia in Journal of the Proceeding of the Linnean Society, Botany from specimens collected by James Drummond. In 1867, George Bentham transferred the species to the genus Calytrix as C. brevifolia.

== Distribution and habitat ==
This species of Calytrix is found from Shark Bay to the Geraldton-Mullewa district in the Avon Wheatbelt, Carnarvon, Geraldton Sandplains and Yalgoo bioregions of Western Australia. It grows in heath and woodland in sand on sandplains.
