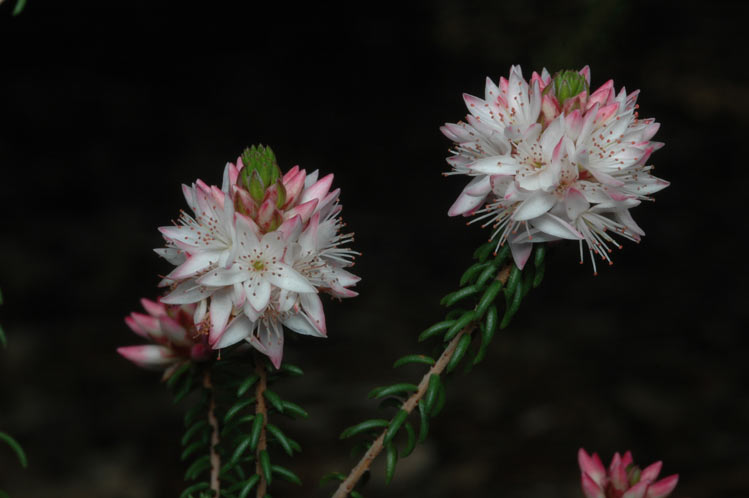
- In the Australian National Botanic Gardens

Scientific classification
- Kingdom: Plantae
- Clade: Tracheophytes
- Clade: Angiosperms
- Clade: Eudicots
- Clade: Rosids
- Order: Myrtales
- Family: Myrtaceae
- Genus: Calytrix
- Species: C. alpestris

Binomial name
- Calytrix alpestris (Lindl.) Court

Synonyms
- List: Genetyllis alpestris Lindl.; Lhotskya alpestris (Lindl.) Druce; Lhotskya alpestris var. bracteosa (Benth.) J.M.Black; Lhotskya genethylloides F.Muell.; Lhotskya genethylloides var. bracteosa Benth.; Lhotskya genethylloides F.Muell. var. genethylloides; Lhotskya genethylloides var. glabra F.Muell.; Lhotzkya alpestris var. bracteosa J.M.Black orth. var.; Lhotzkya genethylloides F.Muell. orth. var.; Lhotzkya genethylloides F.Muell. var. genethylloides orth. var.; Lhotzkya genethylloides var. glabra F.Muell. orth. var.; Lhotzkya genetylloides var. bracteosa Benth. orth. var.

= Calytrix alpestris =

Species of flowering plant

Calytrix alpestris, commonly known as snow-myrtle, is a species of flowering plant in the myrtle family Myrtaceae and is endemic to southern continental Australia. It is a shrub with wiry branchlets, linear to narrowly egg-shaped or narrowly lance-shaped leaves and clusters of white flowers with 14 to 37 white stamens in a single row.

== Description ==
Calytrix alpestris is a shrub that typically grows to a height of up to 2.5 m (8 ft 2 in), and has spreading, wiry, hairy and often arching branchlets. Its leaves are linear to narrowly egg-shaped or narrowly lance-shaped, 1–5 mm (0.039–0.197 in) long and about 0.5 mm (0.020 in) wide on a petiole 0.2–0.7 mm (0.0079–0.0276 in) long. The flowers are arranged in leaf axils near the ends of branches with bracteoles at the base. The floral tube has 10 ribs and is 2.5–4.75 mm (0.098–0.187 in) long and free from the style. The sepals are glabrous, 0.5–1.0 mm (0.020–0.039 in) long and 0.5–1.25 mm (0.020–0.049 in) wide and usually with an awn up to 3.5 mm (0.14 in) long. The petals are white, 4.0–5.75 mm (0.157–0.226 in) long and 2.0–2.75 mm (0.079–0.108 in) wide and there are 14 to 37 white stamens in a single row. Flowering occurs from September to January.

== Taxonomy ==
This species was first described in 1838 by John Lindley who gave it the name Genetyllis alpestris in Thomas Mitchell's Three Expeditions into the interior of Eastern Australia. In 1957, Arthur Bertram Court transferred the species to Calytrix as C. alpestris in The Victorian Naturalist.

== Distribution and habitat ==
Calytrix alpestris grows in heath or heathy woodland in the west and north-west of Victoria and the far south-east of South Australia.
