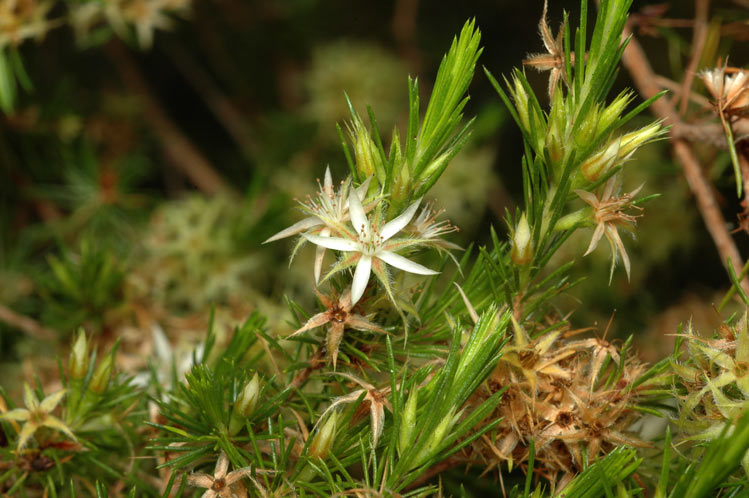
- In the Darwin Botanic Gardens

Scientific classification
- Kingdom: Plantae
- Clade: Tracheophytes
- Clade: Angiosperms
- Clade: Eudicots
- Clade: Rosids
- Order: Myrtales
- Family: Myrtaceae
- Genus: Calytrix
- Species: C. brownii

Binomial name
- Calytrix brownii (Schauer) Craven

= Calytrix brownii =

Species of flowering plant

Calytrix brownii, commonly known as the white turkeybush, is a species of plant in the myrtle family Myrtaceae and is endemic to northern Australia. It is an erect or prostrate shrub with linear to narrowly elliptic leaves and white to creamish, star-shaped flowers with about 18 to 25 white stamens in a single row.

== Description ==
Calytrix brownii is an erect or prostrate shrub that typically grows to a height of 0.2–4 m (7.9 in – 13 ft 1.5 in), its branchlets sometimes covered with soft hairs. Its leaves are linear to narrowly elliptic, 2–11 mm (0.079–0.433 in) long and 0.3–1 mm (0.012–0.039 in) wide on a petiole 0.25–1.3 mm (0.0098–0.0512 in) long. There are stipules up to 0.3 mm (0.012 in) long at the base of the petioles. Each flower is on a peduncle 0.25–0.5 mm (0.0098–0.0197 in) long with bracteoles 2–5 mm (0.079–0.197 in) long. The floral tube has 10 ribs and is free from the style. The sepals are joined at the base with egg-shaped to lance-shaped lobes 2.5–5.0 mm (0.098–0.197 in) long and 0.75–1.25 mm (0.030–0.049 in) wide. The petals are white to creamish, 3.0–4.75 mm (0.118–0.187 in) long and 1–2 mm (0.039–0.079 in) wide and there are about 18 to 25 stamens in a single row. Flowering occurs from February to December with a peak between March and August.

== Taxonomy ==
This species was first formally described in 1843 by Johannes Conrad Schauer who gave it the name Calycothrix brownii in his Monographia Myrtacearum Xerocarpicarum. In 1987, Lyndley Craven transferred the species to the genus Calytrix as C. brownii. The specific epithet (brownii) honours Robert Brown.

== Distribution and habitat ==
Calytrix brownii is found along watercourses, on sandstone outcrops and plateaus in the Kimberley region of Western Australia, the northern parts of the Northern Territory and eastwards to the Nicholson–Gregory Rivers system of Queensland.
