= Calytrix verruculosa =

Conservation status
- Priority Three — Poorly Known Taxa (DEC)

Scientific classification
- Kingdom: Plantae
- Clade: Tracheophytes
- Clade: Angiosperms
- Clade: Eudicots
- Clade: Rosids
- Order: Myrtales
- Family: Myrtaceae
- Genus: Calytrix
- Species: C. verruculosa

Binomial name
- Calytrix verruculosa Craven

Species of flowering plant

Calytrix verruculosa is a species of flowering plant in the myrtle family Myrtaceae and is endemic to inland areas of Western Australia. It is a glabrous shrub with linear or lance-shaped leaves and white or pink flowers with about 22 to 27 stamens in a single row.

== Description ==
Calytrix verruculosa is a glabrous shrub that typically grows to a height of 60 cm (24 in) and has minutely rough branchlets. It usually grows from the tips of the flowering stems. Its leaves are linear to lance-shaped, 3.5–10 mm (0.14–0.39 in) long and 0.7–1.5 mm (0.028–0.059 in) wide on a petiole 0.25–0.75 mm (0.0098–0.0295 in) long, with stipules up to 0.75 mm (0.030 in) long at the base of the petiole. The flowers are on a more or less spindle-shaped peduncle 12–14 mm (0.47–0.55 in) long with elliptic to egg-shaped lobes 9–10.5 mm (0.35–0.41 in) long. The floral tube is spindle-shaped, 12–16 mm (0.47–0.63 in) long and has ten ribs. The sepals are egg-shaped, 3.25–5.5 mm (0.128–0.217 in) long, 3–4 mm (0.12–0.16 in) wide with an awn up to 20 mm (0.79 in) long. The petals are pink or white, elliptic to lance-shaped, 8.5–14 mm (0.33–0.55 in) long and 2.75–4 mm (0.108–0.157 in) wide, and there are about 22 to 27 stamens in a single row, the filaments 2–8.5 mm (0.079–0.335 in) long. Flowering occurs in October.

== Taxonomy ==
Calytrix verruculosa was first formally described in 1987 by the botanist Lyndley Craven in the journal Brunonia from specimens collected 16 km (9.9 mi) north of Meekatharra.

== Distribution and habitat ==
This species of Calytrix is found in the Meekatharra district on hardpan plains with sparse mulga (Acacia aneura), in the Murchison bioregion of inland Western Australia.

== Conservation status ==
Calytrix verruculosa is listed as "Priority Three" by the Government of Western Australia Department of Biodiversity, Conservation and Attractions, meaning that it is poorly known and known from only a few locations but is not under imminent threat.
