= Calytrix amethystina =

Scientific classification
- Kingdom: Plantae
- Clade: Tracheophytes
- Clade: Angiosperms
- Clade: Eudicots
- Clade: Rosids
- Order: Myrtales
- Family: Myrtaceae
- Genus: Calytrix
- Species: C. amethystina

Binomial name
- Calytrix amethystina Craven

Species of flowering plant

Calytrix amethystina is a species of flowering plant in the myrtle family Myrtaceae and is endemic to inland areas of Western Australia. It is a glabrous shrub with egg-shaped to oblong or more or less round leaves and clusters of purple to violet flowers with about 35 to 80 white stamens in several rows.

== Description ==
Calytrix amethystina is a glabrous shrub that typically grows to a height of 20–60 cm (7.9–23.6 in). Its leaves are egg-shaped with the narrower end towards the base, to oblong or more or less round, 0.7–3.0 mm (0.028–0.118 in) long and 0.6–1.25 mm (0.024–0.049 in) wide on a petiole 0.25–0.5 mm (0.0098–0.0197 in) long, with a stipule up to 0.4 mm (0.016 in) long at the base of the petiole. The flowers are arranged singly in leaf axils, the floral tube cylindrical, 10–12 mm (0.39–0.47 in) long with 10 ribs. The sepals are joined for up to 0.5 mm (0.020 in) at the base, the lobes 1.4–1.8 mm (0.055–0.071 in) long with an awn up to 14 mm (0.55 in) long. The petals are purple to violet, elliptic to egg-shaped, 7–9.5 mm (0.28–0.37 in) long and 3.0–4.8 mm (0.12–0.19 in) wide with 35 to 80 white stamens in 3 or 4 rows, each 1.25–5 mm (0.049–0.197 in) long, turning reddish-purple as they age. Flowering occurs from July to September.

== Taxonomy ==
Calytrix amethystina was first formally described in 1987 by Lyndley Craven in the journal Brunonia. The specific epithet (amethystina) refers to the colour of the petals.

== Distribution and habitat ==
This species is found amongst rocky outcrops and on breakaways in inland areas of the Coolgardie, Gascoyne, Murchison and Yalgoo bioregions of inland Western Australia.
