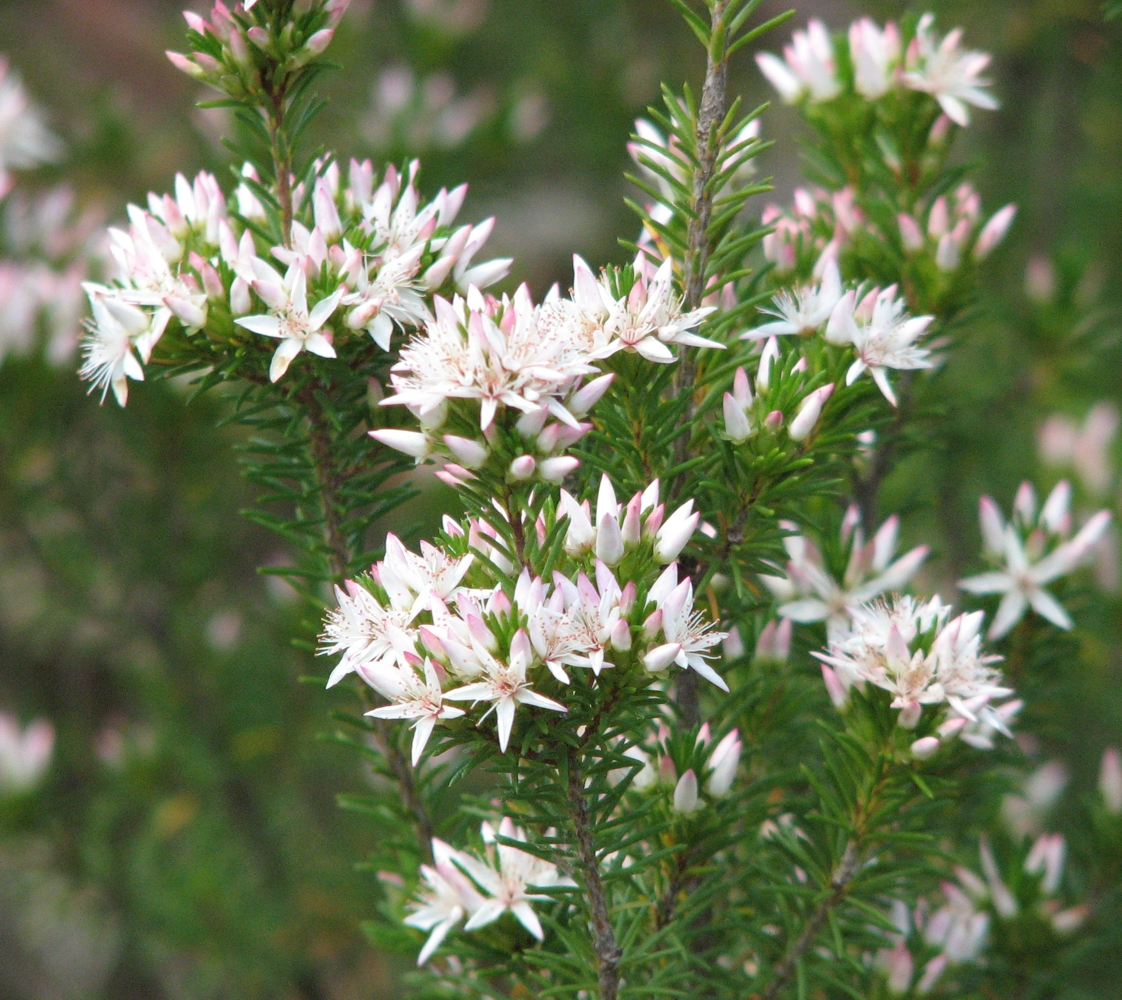
- Calytrix tetragona

Scientific classification
- Kingdom: Plantae
- Clade: Tracheophytes
- Clade: Angiosperms
- Clade: Eudicots
- Clade: Rosids
- Order: Myrtales
- Family: Myrtaceae
- Tribe: Chamelaucieae
- Subtribe: Calytricinae
- Genus: Calytrix; Labill.

Synonyms
- List: Calothrix W.Fitzg. orth. var.; Calycothrix Meisn. nom. illeg., nom. superfl.; Calycothrix A. Octandra Schauer nom. inval., nom. nud.; Calycothrix B. Decandrae Schauer nom. inval., nom. nud.; Calycothrix C. Icosandrae Schauer nom. inval., nom. nud.; Calycothrix I. Exstipulatae Schauer nom. inval., nom. nud.; Calycothrix II. Stipulatae Schauer nom. inval., nom. nud.; Calycothrix sect. Brachychaetae Nied.; Calycothrix Meisn.sect. Calycothrix; Calycothrix sect. Coilosiphon F.Muell. nom. inval., nom. nud.; Calycothrix sect. Lhotskya (Schauer) F.Muell.; Calycothrix sect. Lhotzkya F.Muell. orth. var.; Calycothrix sect. Macrochaetae Nied. nom. inval.; Calycothrix sect. Plerosiphon F.Muell.; Calythrix DC. orth. var.; Calythrix sect. Brachychaetae C.A.Gardner orth. var.; Calythrix sect. Coelotrachylae J.M.Black orth. var.; Calythrix sect. Eucalythrix Kuntze nom. inval.; Calythrix sect. Lhotskya Kuntze orth. var.; Calythrix sect. Lhotzkya Kuntze orth. var.; Calythrix sect. Macrochaetae C.A.Gardner orth. var.; Calythrix sect. Stereotrachylae J.M.Black orth. var.; Calythropsis C.A.Gardner; Calytrhix A.Rich. orth. var.; Calytrix sect. Brachychaetae (Nied.) C.A.Gardner; Calytrix Labill. sect. Calytrix; Calytrix sect. Coelotrachylae J.M.Black; Calytrix sect. Lhotskya (Schauer) Kuntze; Calytrix sect. Macrochaetae C.A.Gardner; Calytrix sect. Stereotrachylae J.M.Black; Lhotskya Schauer; Lhotzseya Endl. orth. var.; Trichocalyx Schauer nom. rej.

= Calytrix =

Starflowers

Genus of flowering plants

Calytrix is a genus of about 83 species of flowering plants, commonly known as star flowers, in the family Myrtaceae and is endemic to Australia. Plants in the genus Calytrix are small to large shrubs with small, spreading and more or less round leaves, the flowers arranged singly in leaf axils. The flowers are bisexual with 5 overlapping sepals with a long awn, and many stamens.

== Description ==
Plants in the genus Calytrix are dwarf to large shrubs with overlapping or widely-spaced leaves, but with stipules absent or small. The flowers are arranged singly in leaf axils with 2 bracteoles at the base. The floral tube is usually long and tube-shaped with 5 overlapping sepals with a long awn on the end and 5 lance-shaped to elliptic petals that are free from each other and fall from the flower as it develops. There are many stamens, in one to several whorls. The fruit is a small, dry nut containing a single seed.

== Taxonomy ==
The genus Calytrix was first formally described in 1806 by Jacques Labillardière in his Novae Hollandiae Plantarum Specimen, and the first species he described (the type species was Calytrix tetragona. The genus name (Calytrix) means "calyx hair", referring to the sepal awns.

== Distribution ==
Calytrix are endemic to Australia, occurring in the Northern Territory, Queensland and South Australia, but the majority of species occur in the south-west of Western Australia.

== Species list ==
The following is a list of Calytrix species accepted by the Australian Plant Census as at June 2024:

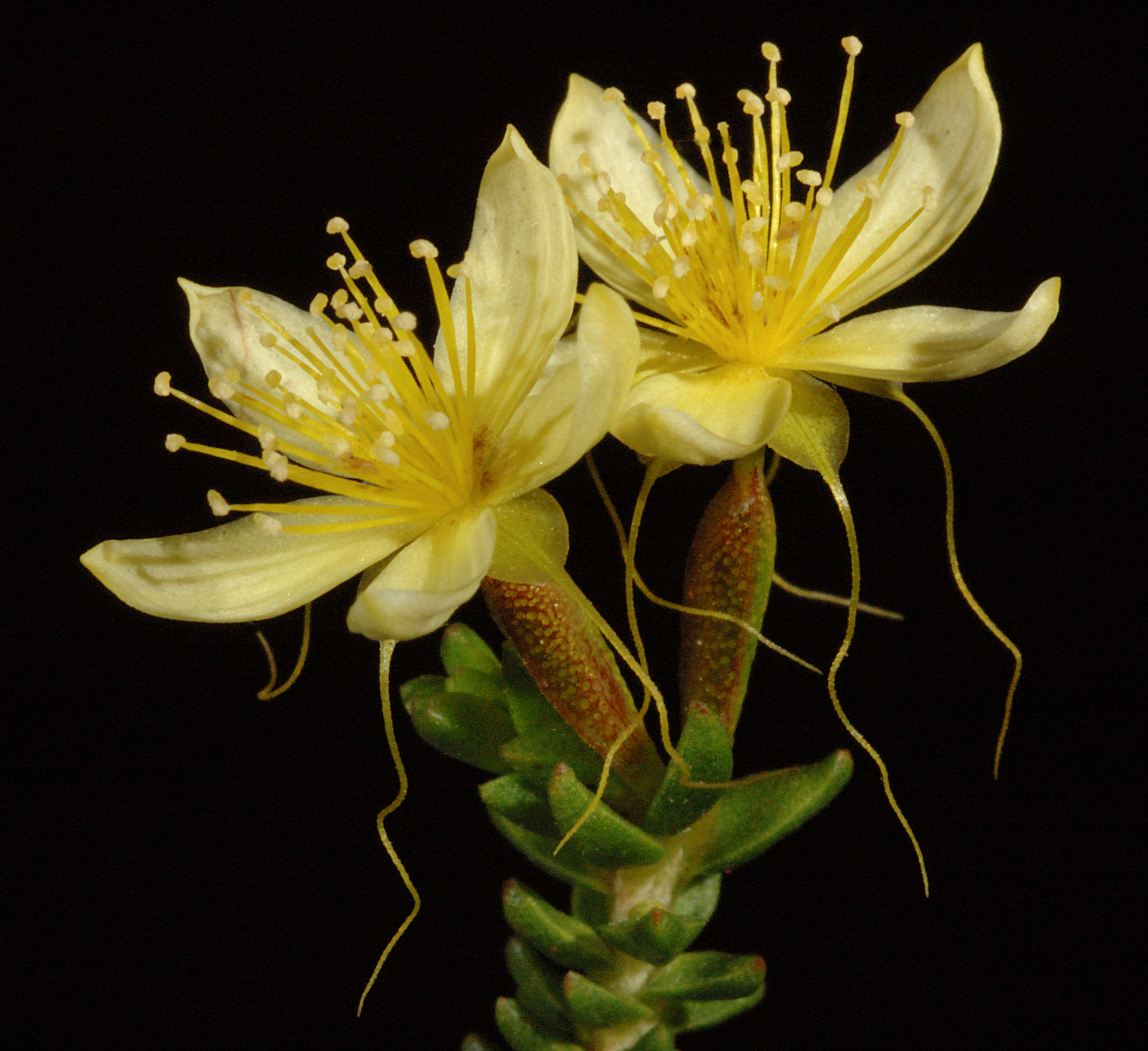
Calytrix angulata

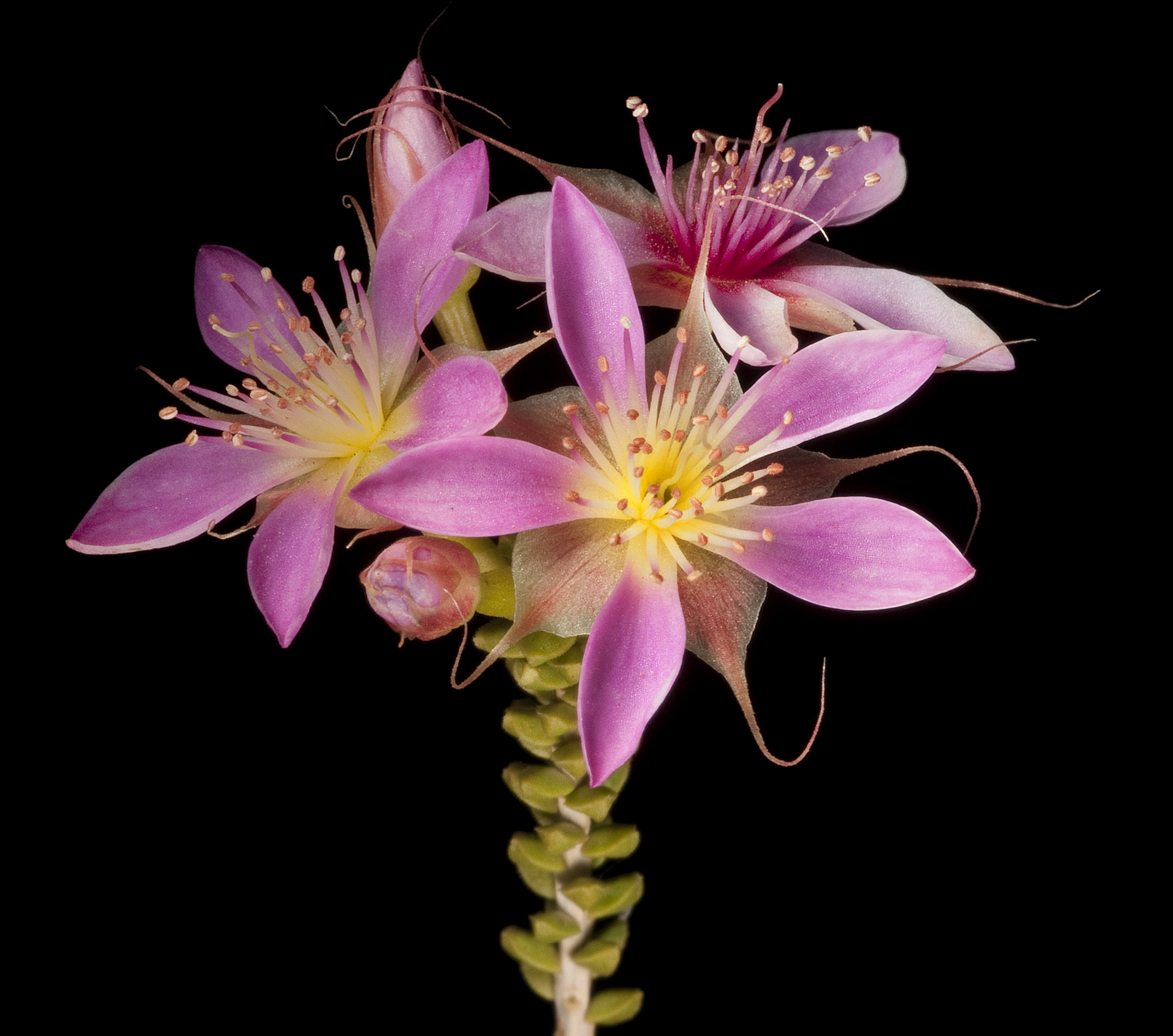
Calytrix carinata

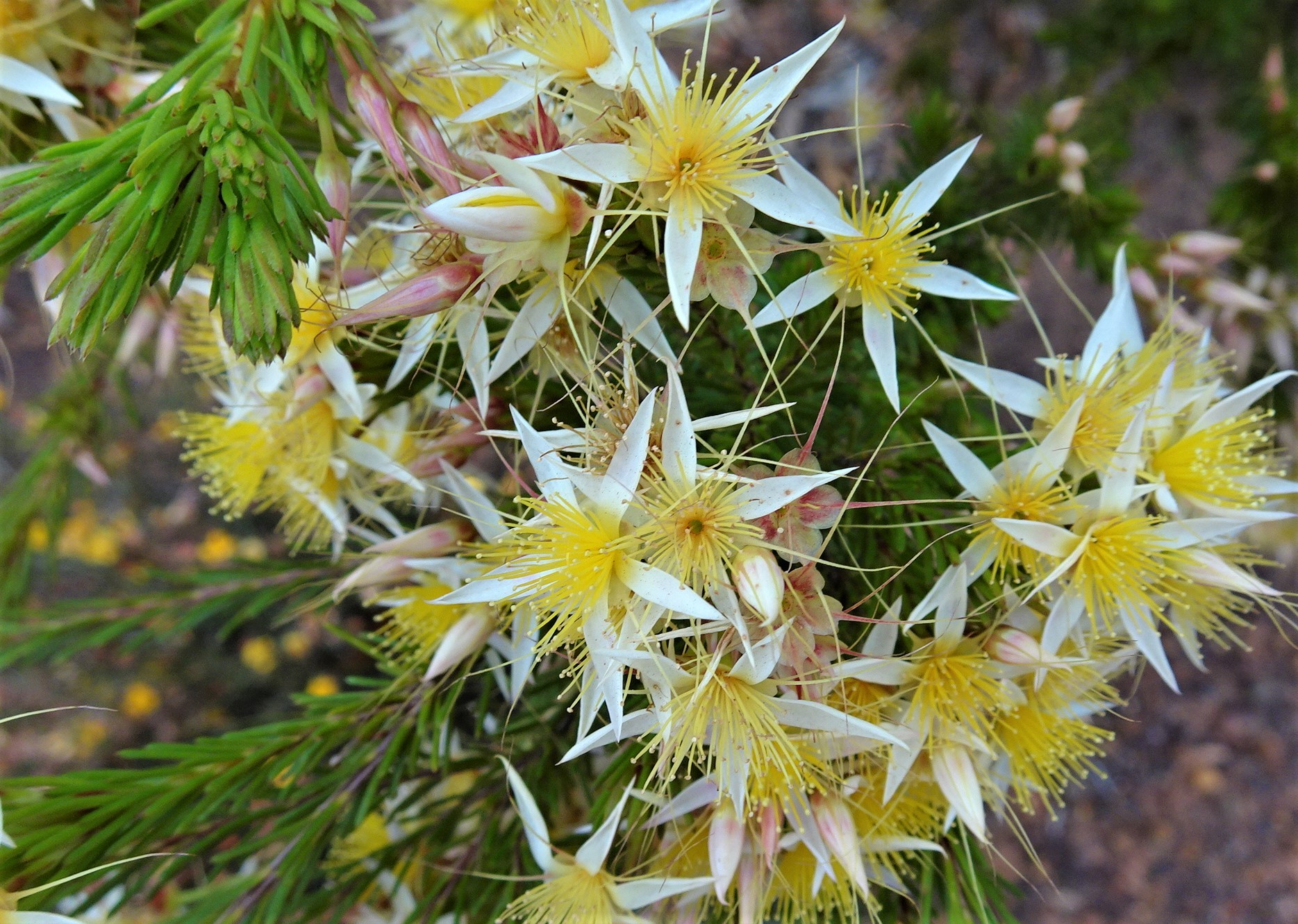
Calytrix gurulmundensis

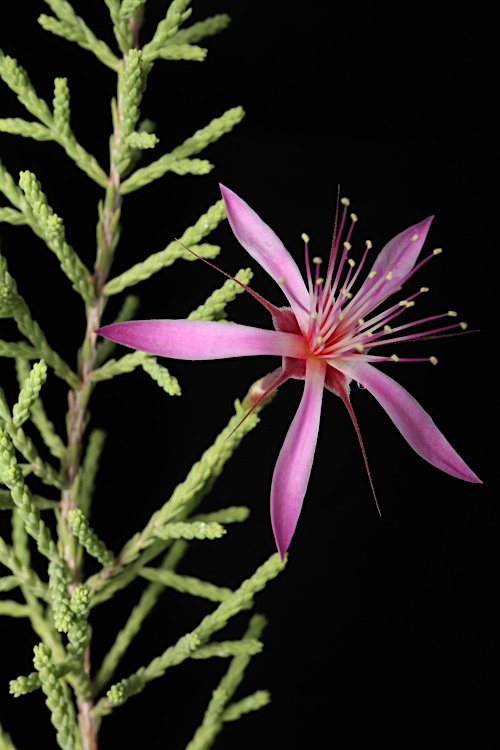
Calytrix exstipulata

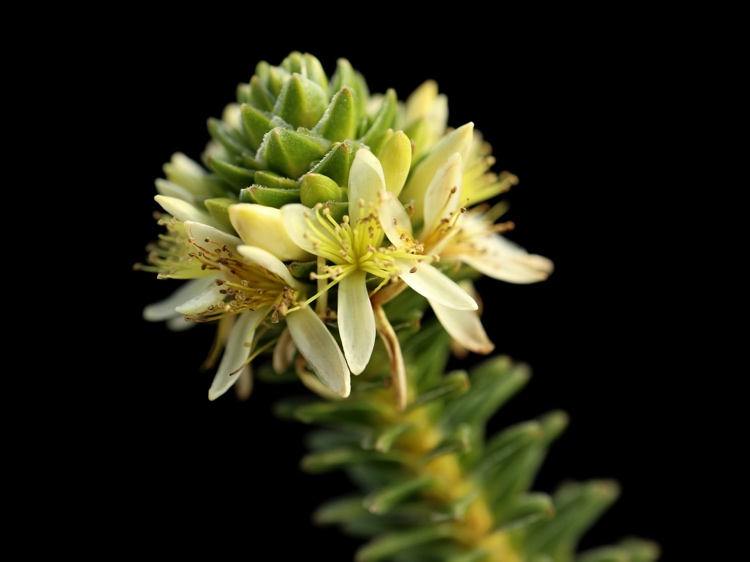
Calytrix pimeleoides

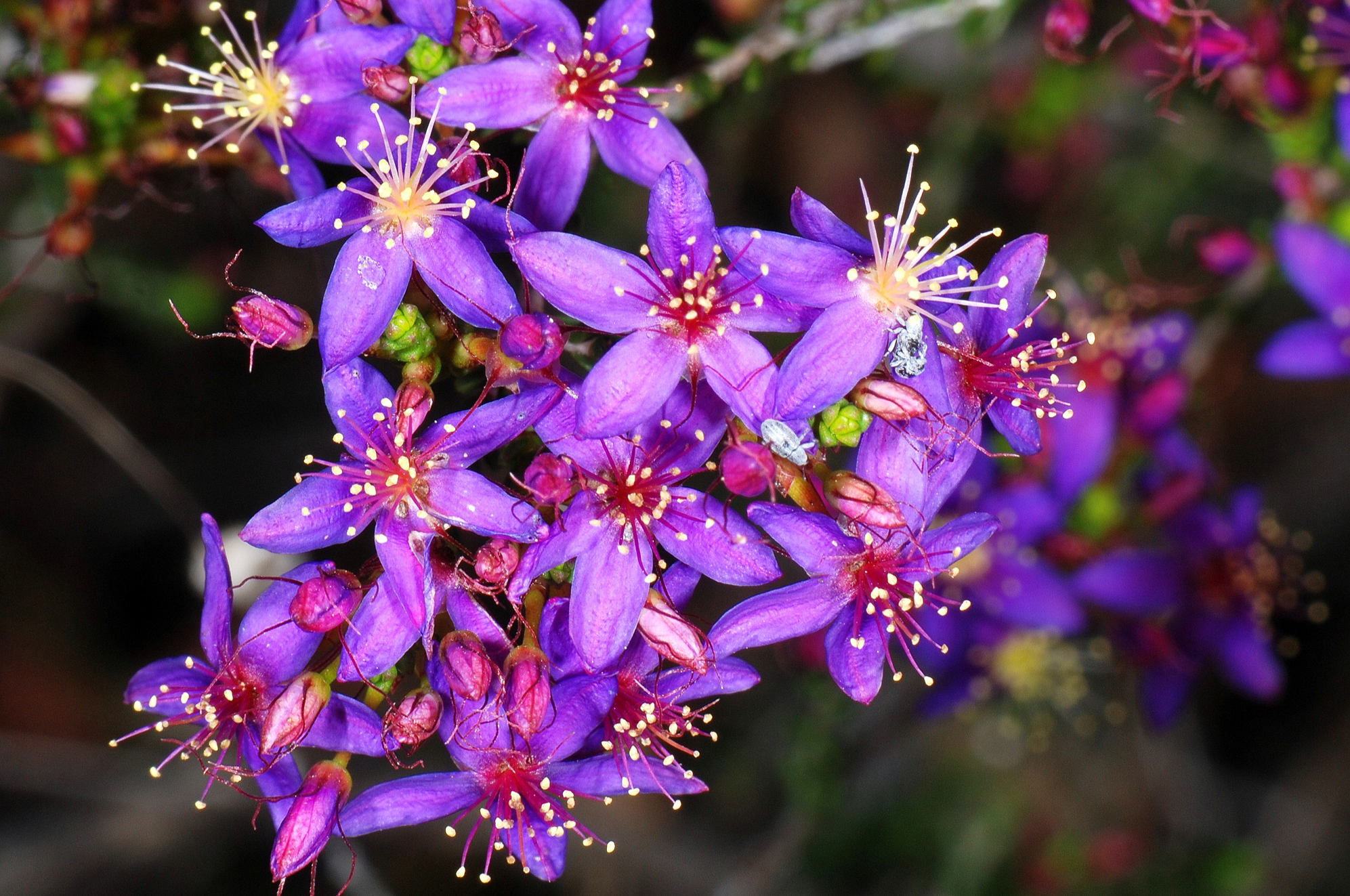
Calytrix simplex

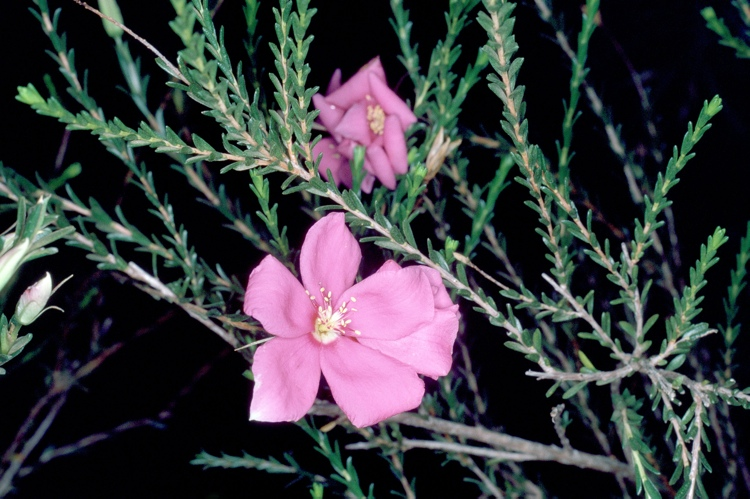
Calytrix superba

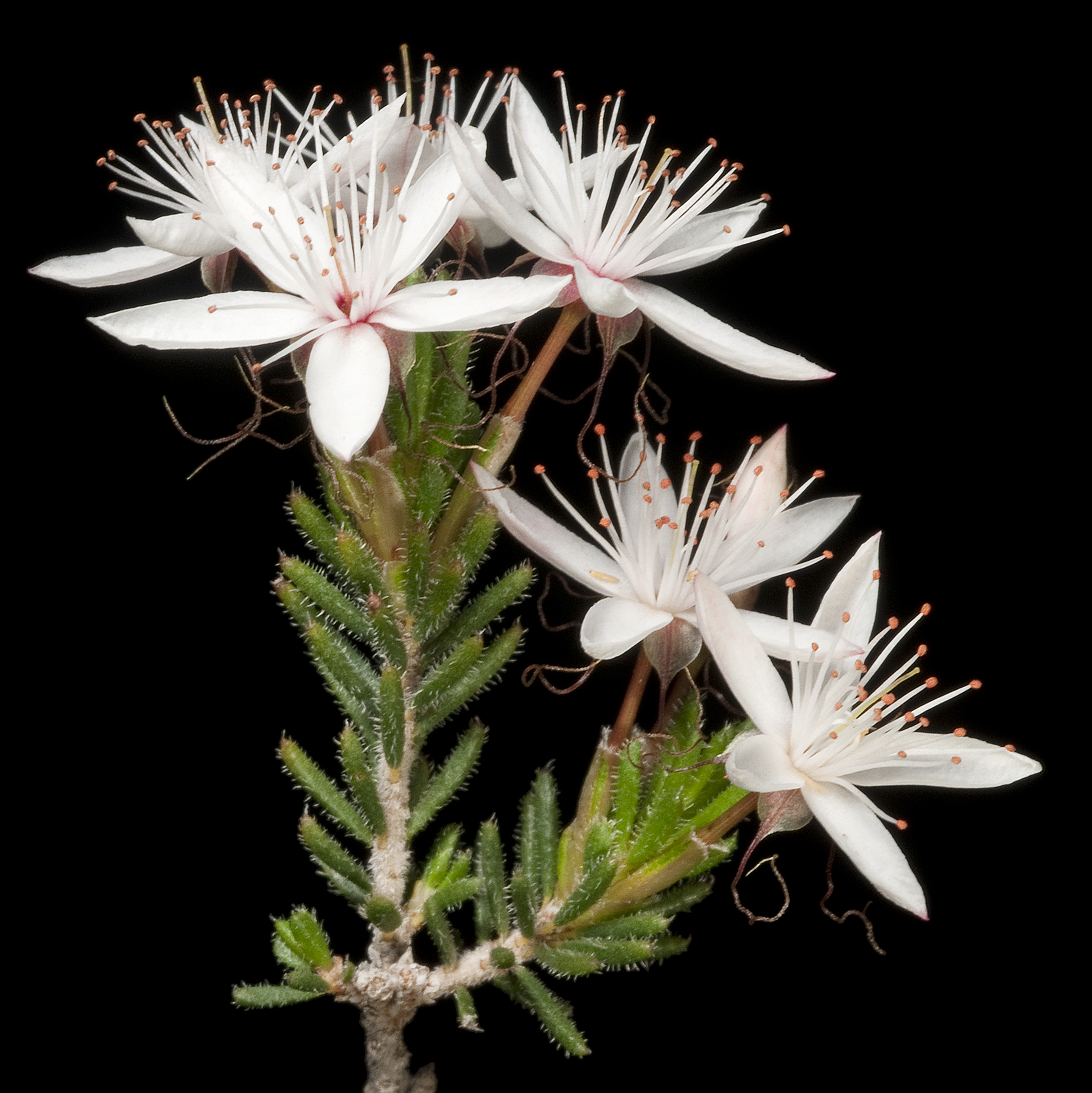
Calytrix tetragona

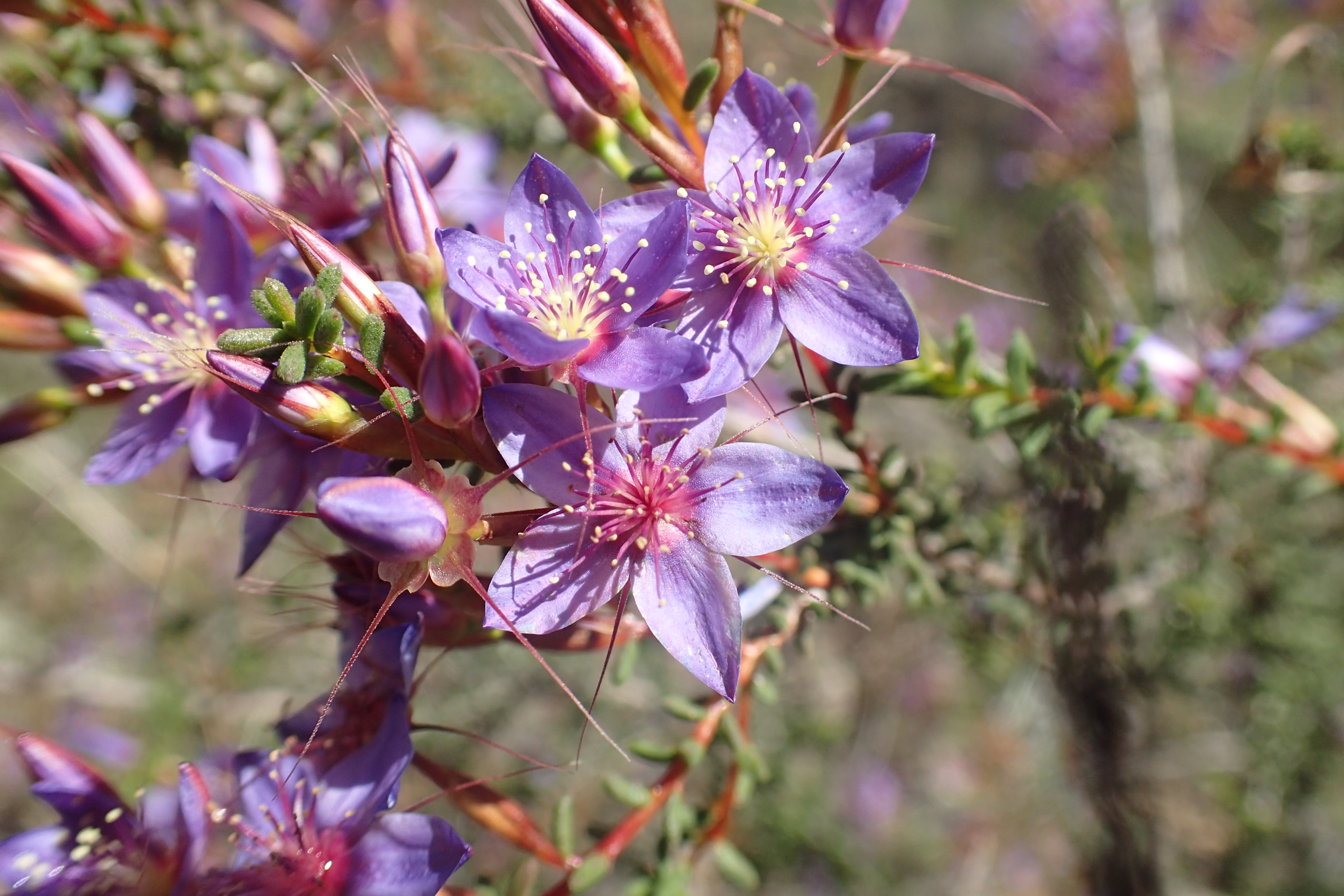
Calytrix violacea

- Calytrix achaeta (F.Muell.) Benth. – white-flowered turkey bush, kerosene wood, fringe-myrtle (N.T., W.A.)
- Calytrix acutifolia (Lindl.) Craven (W.A.)
- Calytrix alpestris (Lindl.) Court - snow myrtle (Vic., S.A.)
- Calytrix amethystina Craven (W.A.)
- Calytrix angulata Lindl. - yellow starflower (W.A.)
- Calytrix arborescens (F.Muell.) Benth. (N.T.)
- Calytrix asperula (Schauer) Benth. - brush starflower (W.A.)
- Calytrix aurea Lindl. (W.A.)
- Calytrix birdii (F.Muell.) B.D.Jacks. (W.A.)
- Calytrix brevifolia (Meisn.) Benth. (W.A.)
- Calytrix breviseta Lindl. (W.A.)
- Calytrix brownii (Schauer) Craven (W.A., N.T., Qld.)
- Calytrix carinata Craven (W.A., N.T., S.A., Qld.)
- Calytrix chrysantha Craven (W.A.)
- Calytrix cravenii Nge & K.R.Thiele (W.A.)
- Calytrix creswellii (F.Muell.) B.D.Jacks. (W.A.)
- Calytrix decandra DC. - pink starflower (W.A.)
- Calytrix decussata Craven (N.T.)
- Calytrix depressa (Turcz.) Benth. (W.A.)
- Calytrix desolata S.Moore (W.A.)
- Calytrix divergens Craven (W.A.)
- Calytrix drummondii (Meisn.) Craven (W.A.)
- Calytrix duplistipulata Craven (W.A.)
- Calytrix ecalycata Craven (W.A.)
- Calytrix eneabbensis Craven (W.A.)
- Calytrix erosipetala Craven (W.A.)
- Calytrix exstipulata DC. - turkey bush, Kimberley heather, heather bush, pink fringe-myrtle (W.A., N.T., Qld.)
- Calytrix faucicola Craven (N.T.)
- Calytrix flavescens A.Cunn. - summer starflower (W.A.)
- Calytrix formosa Craven (W.A.)
- Calytrix fraseri A.Cunn. - pink summer calytrix (W.A.)
- Calytrix glaberrima (F.Muell.) Craven – smooth fringe-myrtle (S.A.)
- Calytrix glutinosa Lindl. (W.A.)
- Calytrix gomphrenoides M.D.Barrett & Craven (W.A.)
- Calytrix gracilis Benth. (W.A.)
- Calytrix gurulmundensis Craven (Qld.)
- Calytrix gypsophila Craven (W.A., S.A.)
- Calytrix habrantha Craven (W.A.)
- Calytrix harvestiana (F.Muell.) Craven (W.A.)
- Calytrix hirta (Regel) Nge & K.R.Thiele (W.A.)
- Calytrix hislopii Rye (W.A.)
- Calytrix inopinata Craven (N.T.)
- Calytrix involucrata J.M.Black - cup fringe-myrtle (S.A.)
- Calytrix islensis Craven (Qld.)
- Calytrix leptophylla Benth. (Qld.)
- Calytrix leschenaultii (Schauer) Benth. (W.A.)
- Calytrix longiflora (F.Muell.) Benth. (Qld., N.S.W.)
- Calytrix megaphylla (F.Muell.) Benth. (N.T.)
- Calytrix merralliana (F.Muell. & Tate) Craven (W.A.)
- Calytrix micrairoides Craven (N.T.)
- Calytrix microcoma Craven – turkey bush (Qld.)
- Calytrix mimiana Craven (N.T.)
- Calytrix nematoclada Craven (W.A.)
- Calytrix oldfieldii Benth. (W.A.)
- Calytrix oncophylla Craven (W.A.)
- Calytrix parvivallis Craven (W.A.)
- Calytrix patrickiae Rye (W.A.)
- Calytrix paucicostata Craven (W.A.)
- Calytrix pimeleoides C.A.Gardner ex Keighery (W.A.)
- Calytrix platycheiridia Craven (W.A.)
- Calytrix plumulosa (F.Muell.) B.D.Jacks. (W.A.)
- Calytrix praecipua Craven (W.A.)
- Calytrix pulchella (Turcz.) B.D.Jacks. (W.A.)
- Calytrix purpurea (F.Muell.) Craven (W.A.)
- Calytrix retrorsifolia Nge & Keighery (W.A.)
- Calytrix rupestris Craven (N.T.)
- Calytrix sagei Rye (W.A.)
- Calytrix sapphirina Lindl. (W.A.)
- Calytrix similis Craven (W.A.)
- Calytrix simplex Lindl. (W.A.)
- Calytrix smeatoniana (F.Muell.) Craven (S.A.)
- Calytrix strigosa A.Cunn. (W.A.)
- Calytrix superba C.A.Gardner & A.S.George - superb starflower (W.A.)
- Calytrix surdiviperana Craven (N.T.)
- Calytrix sylvana Craven (W.A.)
- Calytrix tenuiramea (Turcz.) Benth. (W.A.)
- Calytrix tetragona Labill. - common fringe-myrtle (W.A., S.A., Qld., N.S.W., A.C.T., Vic., Tas.)
- Calytrix truncatifolia Craven (W.A.)
- Calytrix uncinata Craven (W.A.)
- Calytrix variabilis Lindl. (W.A.)
- Calytrix verruculosa Craven (W.A.)
- Calytrix verticillata Craven (N.T.)
- Calytrix violacea (Lindl.) Craven (W.A.)
- Calytrix viscida Rye (W.A.)
- Calytrix warburtonensis Craven (W.A.)
- Calytrix watsonii (F.Muell. & Tate) C.A.Gardner (W.A.)
