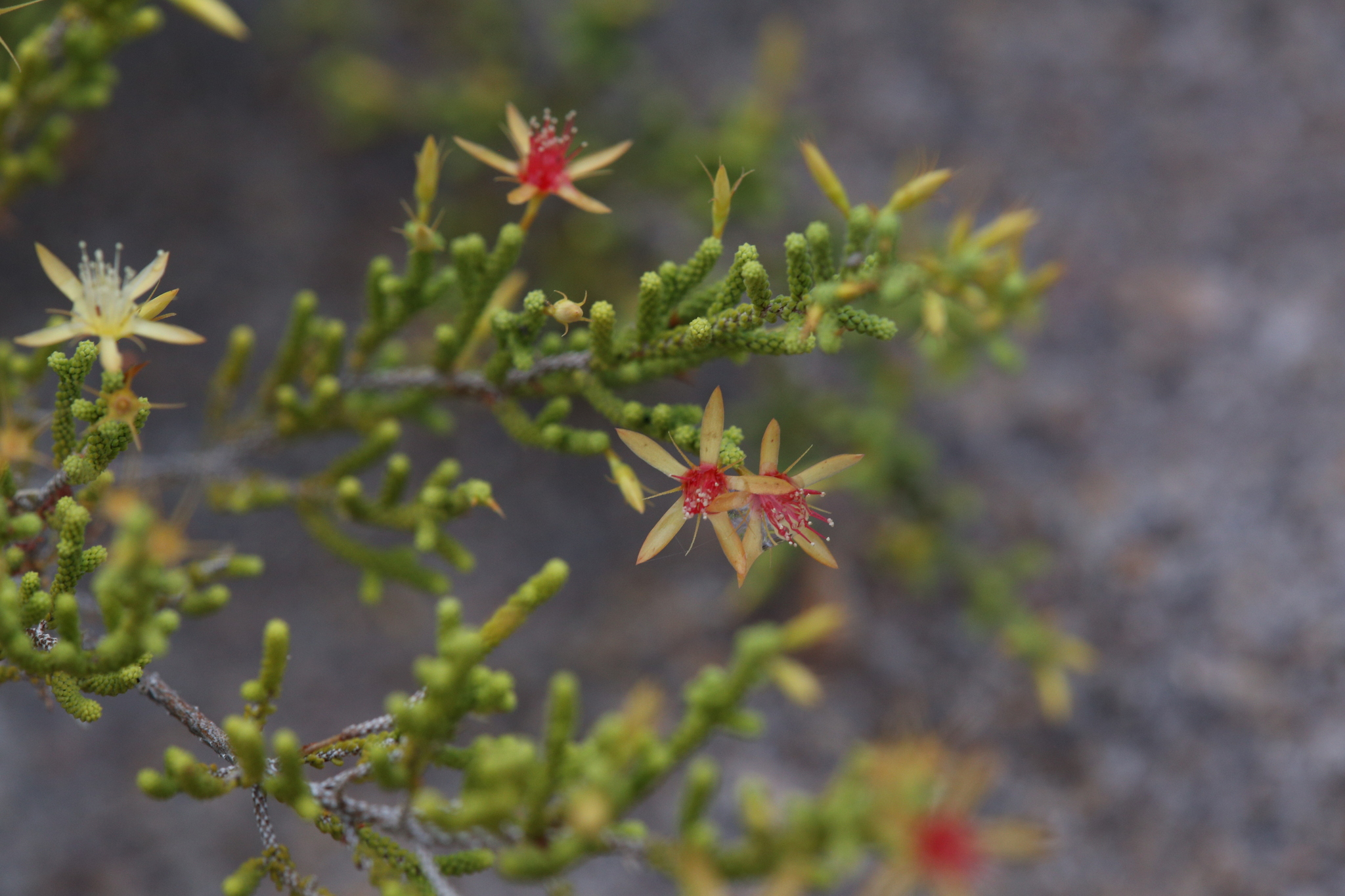
- In the Nitmiluk National Park

Scientific classification
- Kingdom: Plantae
- Clade: Tracheophytes
- Clade: Angiosperms
- Clade: Eudicots
- Clade: Rosids
- Order: Myrtales
- Family: Myrtaceae
- Genus: Calytrix
- Species: C. faucicola

Binomial name
- Calytrix faucicola Craven

= Calytrix faucicola =

Species of flowering plant

Calytrix faucicola is a species of flowering plant in the myrtle family Myrtaceae and is endemic to the Northern Territory of Australia. It is a mostly glabrous shrub with spreading egg-shaped or linear leaves, and pale yellow flowers with about 35 to 45 stamens in several rows.

== Description ==
Calytrix faucicola is a mostly glabrous shrub that typically grows to a height of 1 m (3 ft 3 in). Its leaves are egg-shaped to linear, 0.75–1.25 mm (0.030–0.049 in) long, 0.3–0.5 mm (0.012–0.020 in) wide and sessile or on a petiole up to 0.1 mm (0.0039 in) long. There are stipules up to 0.25 mm (0.0098 in) long at the base of the petioles. The flowers are scattered and borne on a peduncle 3.0–4.25 mm (0.118–0.167 in) long with egg-shaped lobes 1.5–2.4 mm (0.059–0.094 in) long, and the floral tube is 3.25–4.75 mm (0.128–0.187 in) long with 10 ribs. The sepals are free from each other, the lobes more or less egg-shaped with the narrower end towards the base, 0.75–1.0 mm (0.030–0.039 in) long and 1.5–2.0 mm (0.059–0.079 in) wide with an awn up to 7 mm (0.28 in) long. The petals are pale yellow, the base turning reddish later, narrowly elliptic to more or less linear, 7.0–9.5 mm (0.28–0.37 in) long and 1.5–2.0 mm (0.059–0.079 in) wide. There are about 35 to 45 pale yellow stamens 3–8 mm (0.12–0.31 in) long in several rows, and turning reddish as the flowers open.

== Taxonomy ==
Calytrix faucicola was first formally described in 1987 by Lyndley Craven in the journal Brunonia from specimens collected at Edith Falls in 1967. The specific epithet (faucicola) means 'gorge-inhabiting'.

== Distribution and habitat ==
This species of Calytrix grows in Kakadu National Park and Nitmiluk National Park in the Katherine district.
