= Calytrix paucicostata =

Conservation status
- Priority Two — Poorly Known Taxa (DEC)

Scientific classification
- Kingdom: Plantae
- Clade: Tracheophytes
- Clade: Angiosperms
- Clade: Eudicots
- Clade: Rosids
- Order: Myrtales
- Family: Myrtaceae
- Genus: Calytrix
- Species: C. paucicostata

Binomial name
- Calytrix paucicostata Craven

Species of flowering plant

Calytrix paucicostata is a species of flowering plant in the myrtle family Myrtaceae and is endemic to a restricted area in the west of Western Australia. It is a shrub with linear leaves and bright to rich pink flowers with about 75 to 88 stamens in several rows.

== Description ==
Calytrix paucicostata is a mostly glabrous shrub that typically grows to a height of 60 cm (24 in). Its leaves are linear, 5–10 mm (0.20–0.39 in) long and 0.5–1 mm (0.020–0.039 in) wide on a petiole 0.5–1.5 mm (0.020–0.059 in) long with stipules up to 0.3 mm (0.012 in) long at the base. The flowers are borne on a funnel-shaped peduncle 2.5–3.5 mm (0.098–0.138 in) long with egg-shaped lobes 1–2 mm (0.039–0.079 in) long. The floral tube is 5.5–6.5 mm (0.22–0.26 in) long, 0.5–0.8 mm (0.020–0.031 in) wide, and more or less spindle-shaped with three or four ribs. The sepals are more or less round, 0.60–0.75 mm (0.024–0.030 in) long and wide. The petals are bright to rich pink, yellow at the base, later becoming pinkish-yellow, egg-shaped to elliptic, 5.5–6.0 mm (0.22–0.24 in) long and 2.8–3.25 mm (0.110–0.128 in) wide, and there are about 75 to 85 stamens in three to five rows. Flowering occurs in September and October.

== Taxonomy ==
Calytrix paucicostata was first formally described in 1987 by Lyndley Craven in the journal Brunonia from specimens he collected on the edge of Kalbarri township in 1981. The specific epithet (paucicostata) means 'few ribs', referring to the floral tube.

== Distribution and habitat ==
This species of Calytrix grows in heath on yellow sand on sand dunes near Kalbarri in the Geraldton Sandplains bioregion of western Western Australia.

== Conservation status ==
Calytrix paucicostata is listed as "Priority Two" by the Government of Western Australia Department of Biodiversity, Conservation and Attractions, meaning that it is poorly known and from one or a few locations.
