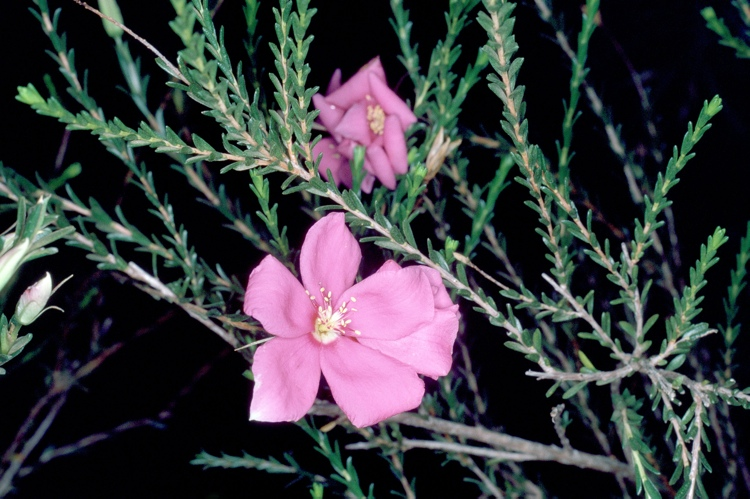
- In the ANBG

Conservation status
- Priority Four — Rare Taxa (DEC)

Scientific classification
- Kingdom: Plantae
- Clade: Tracheophytes
- Clade: Angiosperms
- Clade: Eudicots
- Clade: Rosids
- Order: Myrtales
- Family: Myrtaceae
- Genus: Calytrix
- Species: C. superba

Binomial name
- Calytrix superba C.A.Gardner & A.S.George

= Calytrix superba =

Species of flowering plant

Calytrix superba, commonly known as superb star-flower, is endemic to the south-west of Western Australia. It is a glabrous shrub with elliptic, lance-shaped or linear leaves, and large magenta-pink to red flowers with about 20 to 25 stamens in several rows.

== Description ==
Calytrix superba is a glabrous, spreading shrub that typically grows to a height of 0.2–1 m (7.9 in – 3 ft 3.4 in). Its leaves are elliptic, lance-shaped with the narrower end towards the base, or linear, 2.5–6.5 mm (0.098–0.256 in) long and 1–2 mm (0.039–0.079 in) wide on a petiole 0.4–1 mm (0.016–0.039 in) long. There are stipules up to 0.3 mm (0.012 in) long at the base of the leaves. The flowers are borne on a peduncle 2.0–2.5 mm (0.079–0.098 in) long with egg-shaped bracteoles 10–12 mm (0.39–0.47 in) long. The floral tube is more or less spindle-shaped, 10–15 mm (0.39–0.59 in) long and has ten ribs. The sepals are fused at the base for up to 0.5 mm (0.020 in), with egg-shaped to elliptic lobes 1.5–2.25 mm (0.059–0.089 in) long and 2.0–2.8 mm (0.079–0.110 in) wide, with an awn up to 13 mm (0.51 in) long. The petals are magenta-pink to red with a yellow base, elliptic to egg-shaped, 16–19 mm (0.63–0.75 in) long and 7–10 mm (0.28–0.39 in) wide, and there are about 20 to 25 stamens in two rows. The flowers are much larger than in any other species of Calytrix. Flowering occurs from December to February.

== Taxonomy ==
Calytrix superba was first formally described in 1963 by Charles Austin Gardner and Alex George in the Journal of the Royal Society of Western Australia from specimens collected by Charles Chapman near Eneabba in 1961. The specific epithet (superba), means 'splendid' or 'magnificent'.

== Distribution and habitat ==
Superb star-flower grows in low heath and high shrubland with an open shrub understorey in sand over laterite in the Eneabba district in the Geraldton Sandplains bioregion of south-western Western Australia.

== Conservation status ==
Calytrix superba is listed as "Priority Four" by the Government of Western Australia Department of Biodiversity, Conservation and Attractions, meaning that is rare or near threatened.
