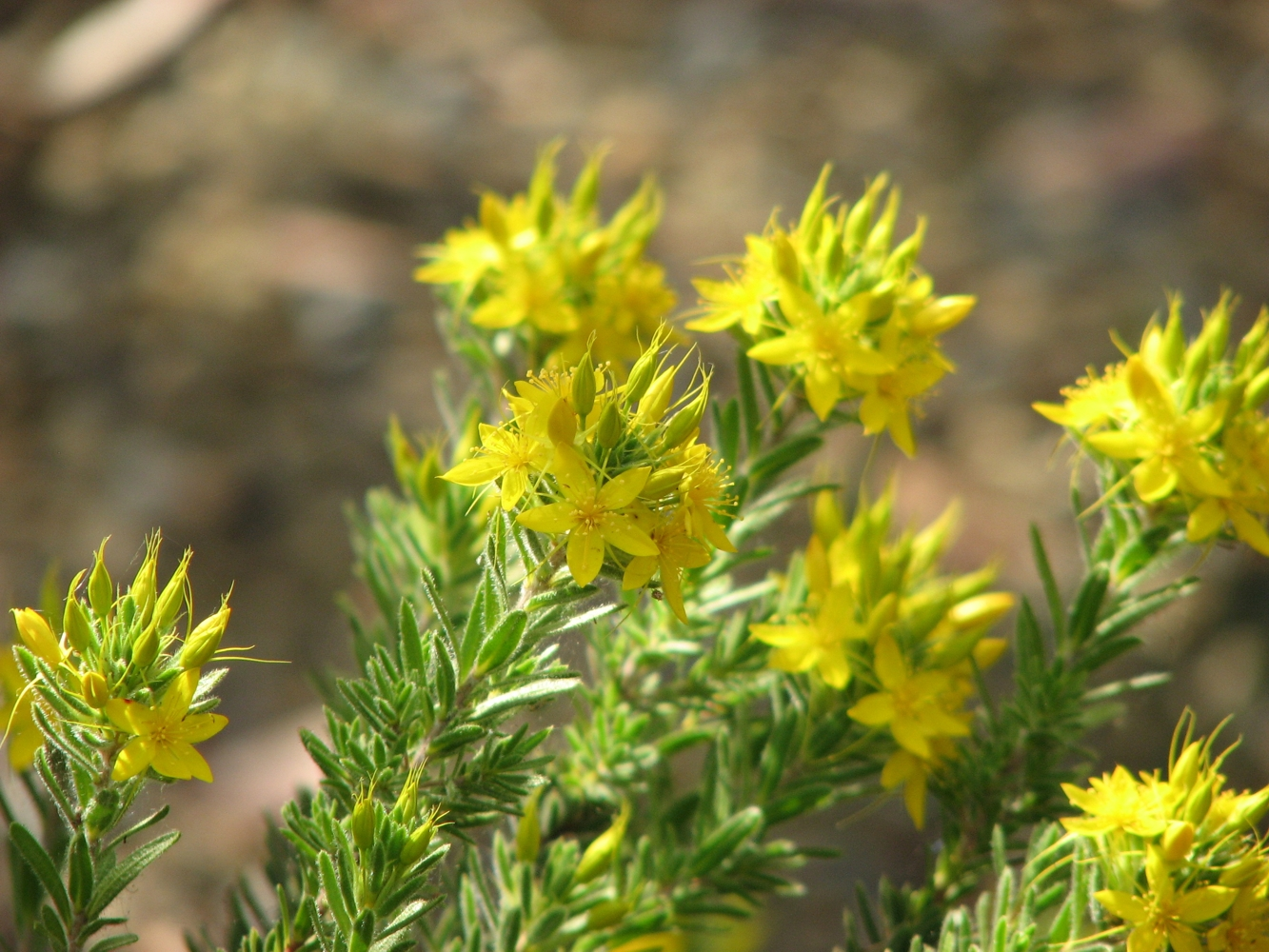

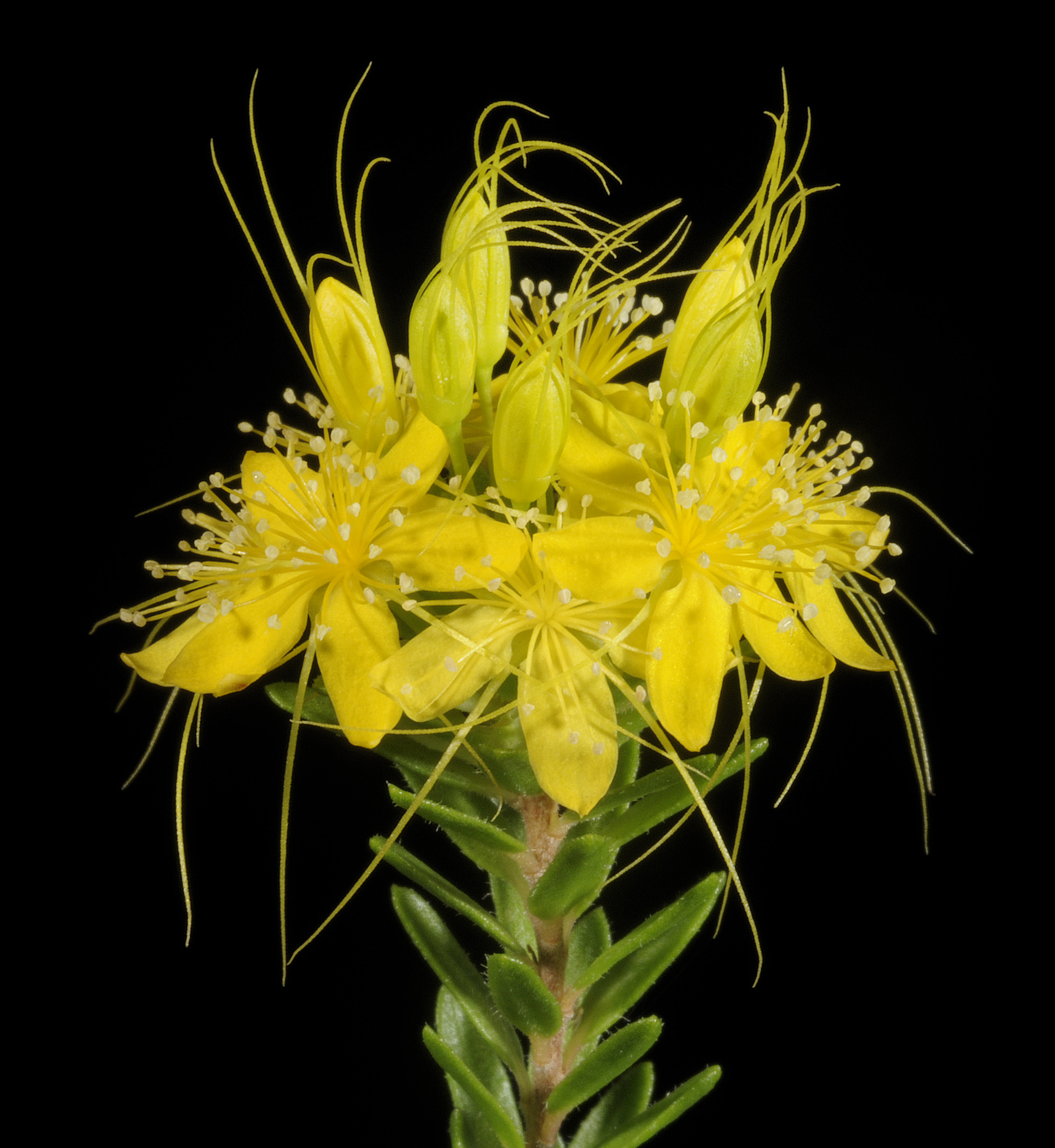

Scientific classification
- Kingdom: Plantae
- Clade: Tracheophytes
- Clade: Angiosperms
- Clade: Eudicots
- Clade: Rosids
- Order: Myrtales
- Family: Myrtaceae
- Genus: Calytrix
- Species: C. aurea

Binomial name
- Calytrix aurea Lindl.

Synonyms
- Calycothrix aurea (Lindl.) Schauer; Calythrix aurea Benth. orth. var.

= Calytrix aurea =

Species of flowering plant

Calytrix aurea is a species of flowering plant in the myrtle family Myrtaceae and is endemic to the south-west of Western Australia. It is a shrub with elliptic, lance-shaped or linear leaves and clusters of yellow flowers with 25 to 55 yellow stamens in several rows.

== Description ==
Calytrix aurea is a shrub that typically grows to a height of 0.2–1.3 m (7.9 in – 4 ft 3.2 in). Its leaves are elliptic, lance-shaped or linear, 5–12 mm (0.20–0.47 in) long and 1.5–5 mm (0.059–0.197 in) wide on a petiole up to 0.5–2 mm (0.020–0.079 in) long. There is a stipule 0.5 mm (0.020 in) long at the base of the petiole. The flowers are arranged singly in clusters, each flower on a peduncle 0.5–1 mm (0.020–0.039 in) long. The floral tube has 10 to 12 ribs and is 9–13 mm (0.35–0.51 in) long. The sepals are joined at the base, 2.0–2.5 mm (0.079–0.098 in) long with an awn up to 17 mm (0.67 in) long. The petals are yellow, egg-shaped to elliptic, 6.5–10 mm (0.26–0.39 in) long and 3.0–4.5 mm (0.12–0.18 in) wide, and there are about 25 to 55 yellow stamens in 2 or 3 rows. Flowering occurs from October to December or January.

== Taxonomy ==
Calytrix aurea was first formally described by botanist John Lindley in 1839 in A sketch of the vegetation of the Swan River Colony. The specific epithet (aurea) means "golden".

== Distribution and habitat ==
This species of Calytrix grows in heath on sand, often over laterite and occurs between the Arrowsmith River area and Perth, in the Avon Wheatbelt, Geraldton Sandplains, Jarrah Forest and Swan Coastal Plain bioregions of south-western Western Australia.

== Use in horticulture ==
This plant performs best in a sunny position and requires a well-drained situation, such as a built-up rockery. Plants are readily propagated by cuttings.
