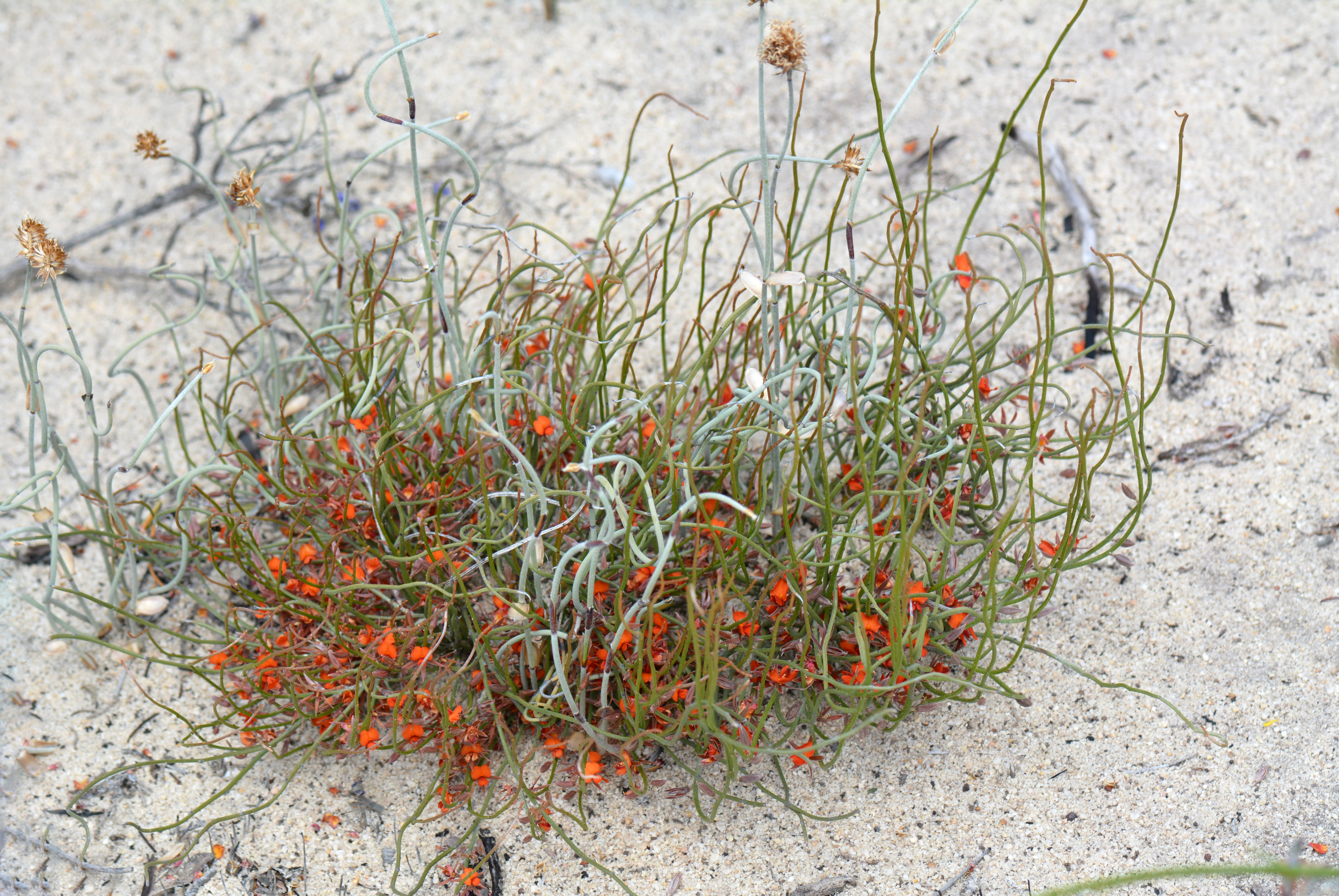
- Near Tammin

Conservation status
- Priority Two — Poorly Known Taxa (DEC)

Scientific classification
- Kingdom: Plantae
- Clade: Tracheophytes
- Clade: Angiosperms
- Clade: Eudicots
- Clade: Rosids
- Order: Fabales
- Family: Fabaceae
- Subfamily: Faboideae
- Genus: Jacksonia
- Species: J. rubra

Binomial name
- Jacksonia rubra Chappill

= Jacksonia rubra =

Species of legume

Jacksonia rubra is a species of flowering plant in the family Fabaceae and is endemic to the south-west of Western Australia. It is a prostrate, spreading or scrambling, tufted shrub with greyish-green to mid-green branches, densely hairy branchlets, the leaves reduced to dark brown, toothed, egg-shaped scales, deep orange-red flowers scattered along the branches, and membranous, elliptic pods.

== Description ==
Jacksonia rubra is a prostrate, spreading or scrambling, tufted shrub that typically grows up to 15–20 cm (5.9–7.9 in) high and 20–50 cm (7.9–19.7 in) wide. It has greyish-green to mid-green branches, its leaves reduced to egg-shaped, dark brown scales, 0.6–1.8 mm (0.024–0.071 in) long and 0.4–1.2 mm (0.016–0.047 in) wide. The flowers are scattered along the branches on a pedicel 1.4–3.7 mm (0.055–0.146 in) long, with egg-shaped bracteoles 0.7–1.3 mm (0.028–0.051 in) long and 0.45–0.75 mm (0.018–0.030 in) wide with toothed edges. The floral tube is 0.7–1 mm (0.028–0.039 in) long and the sepals are membranous, with lobes 4.3–7 mm (0.17–0.28 in) long, 0.7–1.6 mm (0.028–0.063 in) wide and fused for 0.3–0.4 mm (0.012–0.016 in). The petals are deep orange-red, the standard petal 3–4 mm (0.12–0.16 in) long and 3.5–5.1 mm (0.14–0.20 in) deep, the wings 3.6–4.2 mm (0.14–0.17 in) long, and the keel 3.5–3.7 mm (0.14–0.15 in) long. The stamens have green filaments, 2.0–3.3 mm (0.079–0.130 in) long. Flowering occurs from August to November, and the fruit is a membranous, densely hairy elliptic pod 5–6 mm (0.20–0.24 in) long and 2.8–3.0 mm (0.11–0.12 in) wide.

== Taxonomy ==
Jacksonia rubra was first formally described in 2007 by Jennifer Anne Chappill in Australian Systematic Botany from specimens collected near Pontifex Road, east of Kellerberrin in 1992. The specific epithet (rubra) means 'red'.

== Distribution and habitat ==
This species of Jacksonia grows in heathland, on sand over laterite in three populations near Badgingarra, Tammin and Yarding in the Avon Wheatbelt and Geraldton Sandplains bioregions of western Western Australia.

== Conservation status ==
Jacksonia rubra is listed as "Priority Two" by the Western Australian Government Department of Biodiversity, Conservation and Attractions, meaning that it is poorly known and from only one or a few locations.
