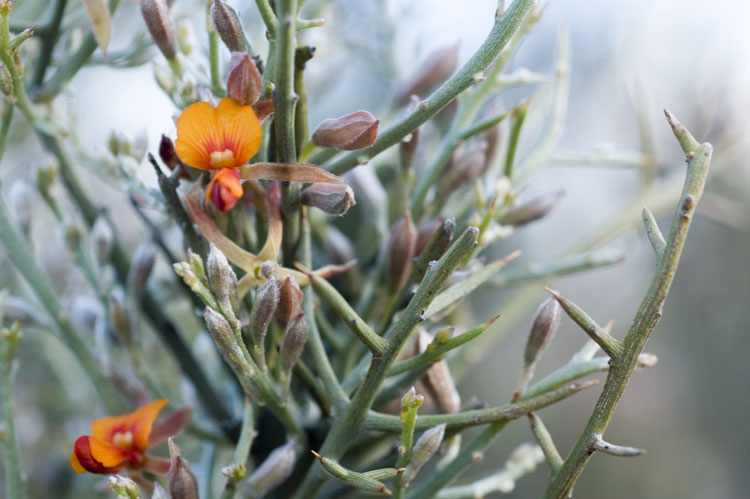
- Near Bullfinch

Scientific classification
- Kingdom: Plantae
- Clade: Tracheophytes
- Clade: Angiosperms
- Clade: Eudicots
- Clade: Rosids
- Order: Fabales
- Family: Fabaceae
- Subfamily: Faboideae
- Genus: Jacksonia
- Species: J. acicularis

Binomial name
- Jacksonia acicularis Chappill

= Jacksonia acicularis =

Species of legume

Jacksonia acicularis is a species of flowering plant in the family Fabaceae and is endemic to the west of Western Australia. It is an erect, spindly shrub with very sharply-pointed short side branches, leaves reduced to scales, orange flowers with red markings, and densely hairy pods.

== Description ==
Jacksonia acicularis is an erect, spindly shrub that typically grows up to 1–3 m (3 ft 3 in – 9 ft 10 in) high and 0.5–1 m (1 ft 8 in – 3 ft 3 in) wide, its branches greyish-green with scattered, very sharply-pointed side branches 2.4–22 mm (0.094–0.866 in) wide and about 1.5 mm (0.059 in) wide. Its leaves are reduced to narrowly triangular scales, 0.7–3.2 mm (0.028–0.126 in) long and 0.6–1.4 mm (0.024–0.055 in) wide. The flowers are arranged singly or clustered along the sharply-pointed branchlets on a pedicel 1–3.7 mm (0.039–0.146 in) long. There are narrowly egg-shaped bracteoles 0.6–2.7 mm (0.024–0.106 in) long on the pedicels. The floral tube is 0.5–1.5 mm (0.020–0.059 in) long and the sepals are membranous, 7.2–9.6 mm (0.28–0.38 in) long and 1.5–2.5 mm (0.059–0.098 in) wide. The standard petal is orange with red markings, 5.2–6.8 mm (0.20–0.27 in) long, the wings orange and 6.3–7.6 mm (0.25–0.30 in) long, and the keel is deep red, 6.9–7.8 mm (0.27–0.31 in) long. The stamens have pink filaments 5.7–8.3 mm (0.22–0.33 in) long. Flowering occurs from August to October, and the fruit is a membranous, densely hairy, broadly elliptic pod 3.8–5 mm (0.15–0.20 in) long and 2.6–3.6 mm (0.10–0.14 in) wide.

== Taxonomy ==
Jacksonia acicularis was first formally described in 2007 by Jennifer Anne Chappill in Australian Systematic Botany from specimens collected near Paynes Find in 1992. The specific epithet (acicularis) means 'needle-pointed' referring to the branchlets.

== Distribution and habitat ==
Jacksonia acicularis grows in shrubland on sand between Binnu, Nugadong and Paynes Find in the Avon Wheatbelt, Murchison and Yalgoo bioregions of western Western Australia.
