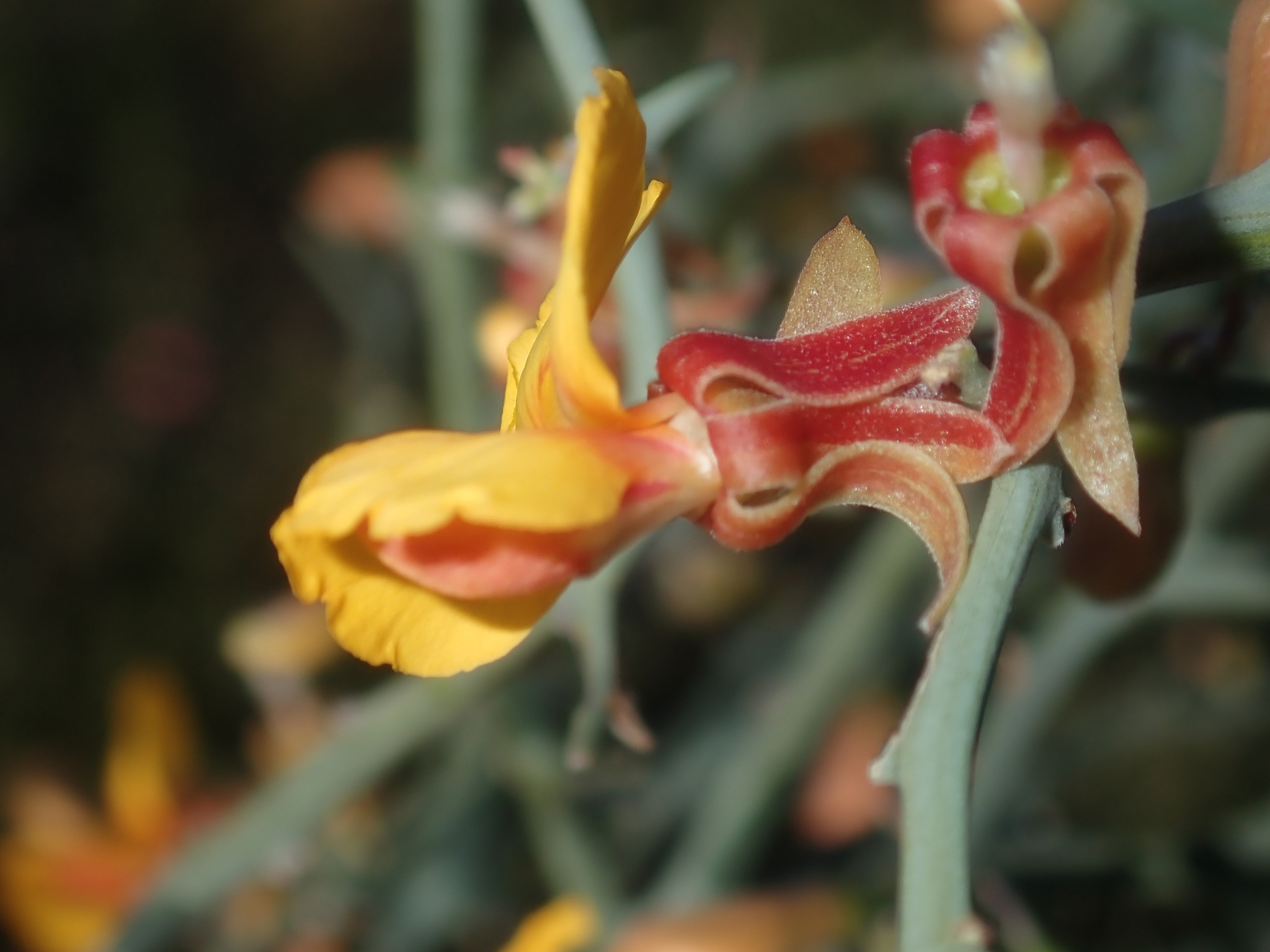

Scientific classification
- Kingdom: Plantae
- Clade: Tracheophytes
- Clade: Angiosperms
- Clade: Eudicots
- Clade: Rosids
- Order: Fabales
- Family: Fabaceae
- Subfamily: Faboideae
- Genus: Jacksonia
- Species: J. rigida

Binomial name
- Jacksonia rigida Chappill

= Jacksonia rigida =

Species of legume

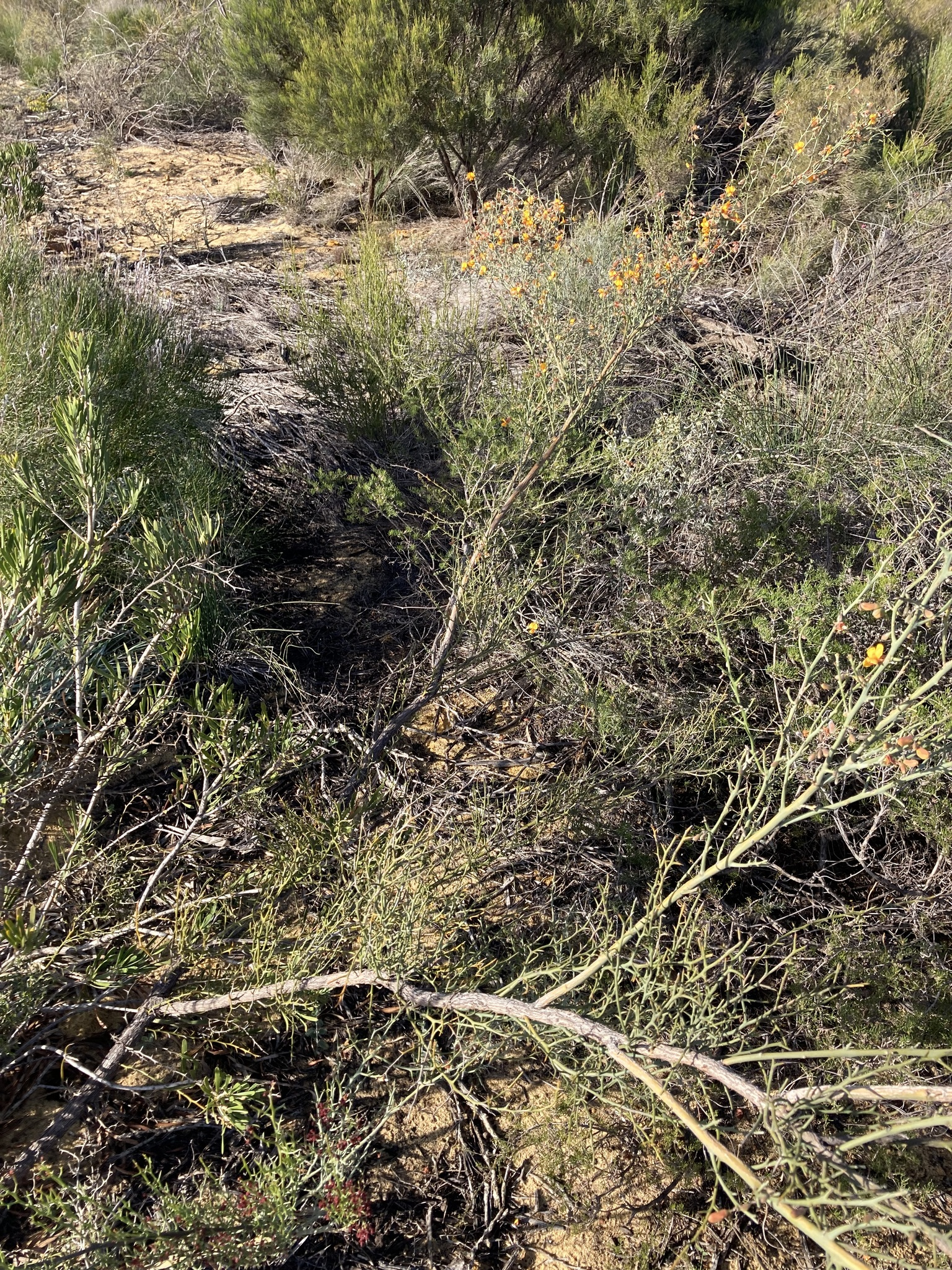
Habit on the road to Kalbarri

Jacksonia rigida is a species of flowering plant in the family Fabaceae and is endemic to the west of Western Australia. It is an erect, leafless, prickly shrub with greyish-green branches, scattered, sharply-pointed branchlets, the leaves reduced to dark brown, egg-shaped scales, yellow-orange flowers with red marking arranged singly on branches, and woody, curved and flattened pods.

== Description ==
Jacksonia rigida is an erect to sprawling, sturdy shrub or small tree that typically grows up to 0.3–6 m (1 ft 0 in – 19 ft 8 in) high and 1–4 m (3 ft 3 in – 13 ft 1 in) wide. It has greyish-green branches with scattered, sharply-pointed branchlets 5.8–22 mm (0.23–0.87 in) long and 1–2 mm (0.039–0.079 in) wide, its leaves reduced to egg-shaped, dark brown scales, 0.7–1.4 mm (0.028–0.055 in) long and 0.9–1.4 mm (0.035–0.055 in) wide but that usually fall off as the branchlets mature. The flowers are arranged singly on the branches or on short side-shoots on a pedicel 3.4–7.3 mm (0.13–0.29 in) long, with broadly egg-shaped bracteoles 0.6–1 mm (0.024–0.039 in) long and wide with irregular edges. The floral tube is 1.5–2.3 mm (0.059–0.091 in) long and the sepals are membranous, with lobes 8.4–10.8 mm (0.33–0.43 in) long, 1.2–2.1 mm (0.047–0.083 in) wide and fused for 1.2–1.3 mm (0.047–0.051 in). The standard petal is yellow-orange with red markings, 7.2–8.9 mm (0.28–0.35 in) long and 8.1–10.2 mm (0.32–0.40 in) deep, the wings are yellow-orange with red markings, 9.3–10.1 mm (0.37–0.40 in) long, and the keel is red, 8.2–8.9 mm (0.32–0.35 in) long. The stamens have green filaments, 6.5–11.1 mm (0.26–0.44 in) long. Flowering occurs from April to November, and the fruit is a woody, densely hairy, curved and flattened pod 7.5–9.5 mm (0.30–0.37 in) long and 3.5–3.6 mm (0.14–0.14 in) wide.

== Taxonomy ==
Jacksonia rigida was first formally described in 2007 by Jennifer Anne Chappill in Australian Systematic Botany from specimens collected in Kalbarri National Park in 1979. The specific epithet (rigida) means 'hard' or 'stiff', referring to the stems.

== Distribution and habitat ==
This species of Jacksonia grows in shrubland on sandplains, on sand over laterite between Kalbarri National Park and Mingenew in the Avon Wheatbelt and Geraldton Sandplains bioregions of western Western Australia.

== Conservation status ==
Jacksonia rigida is listed as "not threatened" by the Government of Western Australia Department of Biodiversity, Conservation and Attractions.
