= Jacksonia intricata =

Conservation status
- Priority Two — Poorly Known Taxa (DEC)

Scientific classification
- Kingdom: Plantae
- Clade: Tracheophytes
- Clade: Angiosperms
- Clade: Eudicots
- Clade: Rosids
- Order: Fabales
- Family: Fabaceae
- Subfamily: Faboideae
- Genus: Jacksonia
- Species: J. intricata

Binomial name
- Jacksonia intricata Chappill

Species of legume

Jacksonia intricata is a species of flowering plant in the family Fabaceae and is endemic to the south of Western Australia. It is a domed, tangled shrub with copper-coloured branches when fresh, the end branches sharply-pointed, the leaves reduced to scales, yellow flowers with red markings, and woody, densely hairy pods.

== Description ==
Jacksonia intricata is a domed, tangled shrub that typically grows to 0.3–1 m (1 ft 0 in – 3 ft 3 in) high and 0.6–1.1 m (2 ft 0 in – 3 ft 7 in) wide, its branches copper-coloured when fresh, greyish-green when dried. Its end branches are sharply-pointed, the leaves reduced to dark brown, egg-shaped scales, 0.7–1.4 mm (0.028–0.055 in) long and 0.5–0.8 mm (0.020–0.031 in) wide with toothed edges. The flowers are scattered along the branches, each flower on a pedicel 1.8–3.4 mm (0.071–0.134 in) long. There are egg-shaped bracteoles 0.6–0.9 mm (0.024–0.035 in) long and 0.4–0.7 mm (0.016–0.028 in) wide on the pedicels. The floral tube is 1.0–1.2 mm (0.039–0.047 in) long and the sepals are membranous, the lobes 6.8–7.8 mm (0.27–0.31 in) long, 1.3–1.8 mm (0.051–0.071 in) wide and fused at the base. The standard petal is yellow with red markings, 6.9–7.0 mm (0.27–0.28 in) long and 7.0–7.7 mm (0.28–0.30 in) deep, the wings yellow with orange-red markings, 5.0–5.5 mm (0.20–0.22 in) long, and the keel is dark red, 5.3–6.2 mm (0.21–0.24 in) long. The stamens have yellow filaments with a red tip, 4.7–7.2 mm (0.19–0.28 in) long. Flowering occurs from November to March, and the fruit is a woody, densely hairy, elliptic pod, 5.0–5.5 mm (0.20–0.22 in) long and 2.5–3.0 mm (0.098–0.118 in) wide.

== Taxonomy ==
Jacksonia intricata was first formally described in 2007 by Jennifer Anne Chappill in Australian Systematic Botany from specimens collected east of Quairading in 1991. The specific epithet (intricata) means 'entangled', referring to the growth habit and the tangled, coppery branches.

== Distribution and habitat ==
This species of Jacksonia grows in shrubland in the Fitzgerald River National Park near Mount Drummond and Roes Rock, in the Esperance Plains bioregion of southern Western Australia.

== Conservation status ==
Jacksonia intricata is listed as "Priority Two" by the Western Australian Government Department of Biodiversity, Conservation and Attractions, meaning that it is poorly known and from only one or a few locations.
