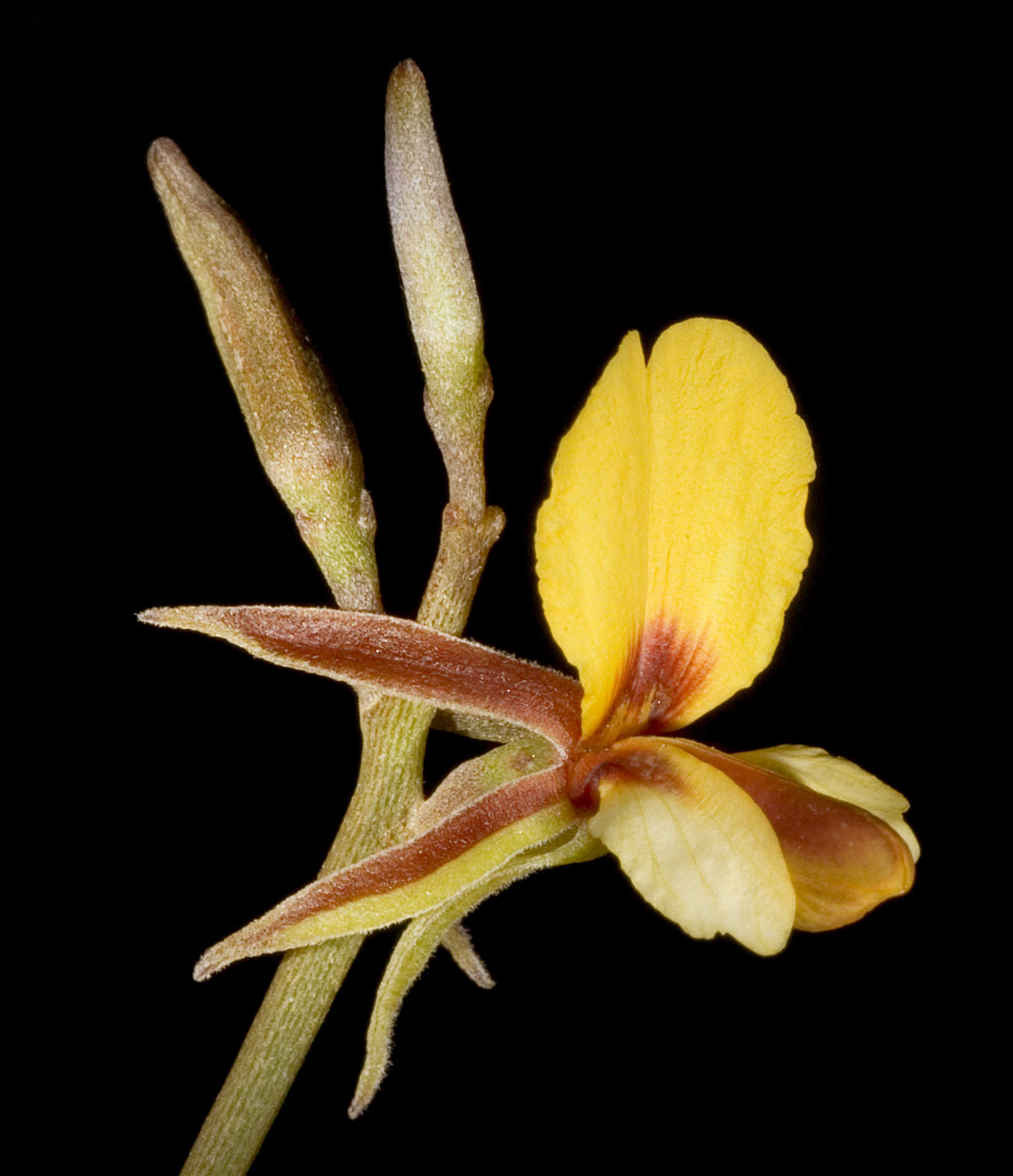

Scientific classification
- Kingdom: Plantae
- Clade: Tracheophytes
- Clade: Angiosperms
- Clade: Eudicots
- Clade: Rosids
- Order: Fabales
- Family: Fabaceae
- Subfamily: Faboideae
- Genus: Jacksonia
- Species: J. elongata

Binomial name
- Jacksonia elongata Chappill

= Jacksonia elongata =

Species of legume

Jacksonia elongata is a species of flowering plant in the family Fabaceae and is endemic to the south of Western Australia. It is an erect or spreading, spindly shrub with yellowish-green branches, yellow-orange flowers with red markings, and woody, densely-hairy pods.

== Description ==
Jacksonia elongata is an erect or spreading, spindly shrub with few branches, and that typically grows up to 0.3–1.5 m (1 ft 0 in – 4 ft 11 in) high and 0.6–2 m (2 ft 0 in – 6 ft 7 in) wide, its branches yellowish-green and round in cross section. Its leaves are reduced to dark brown, egg-shaped scales, 0.5–1.1 mm (0.020–0.043 in) long and 0.5–0.9 mm (0.020–0.035 in) wide. The flowers are scattered along branches, each flower on a pedicel 2–4 mm (0.079–0.157 in) long. There are egg-shaped bracteoles 0.5–1.3 mm (0.020–0.051 in) long and 0.6–1 mm (0.024–0.039 in) wide on the pedicels. The floral tube is 1.0–1.2 mm (0.039–0.047 in) long and the sepals are membranous, the lobes 8.0–9.5 mm (0.31–0.37 in) long, 1.0–1.7 mm (0.039–0.067 in) wide and fused at the base. The standard petal is yellow-orange to orange with a red "eye", 7.4–8.3 mm (0.29–0.33 in) long and 7.3–9.4 mm (0.29–0.37 in) deep, the wings yellow-orange with red markings, 6.3–7.8 mm (0.25–0.31 in) long, and the keel red, 7.7–7.8 mm (0.30–0.31 in) long. The stamens have white or pink filaments 6.3–9.3 mm (0.25–0.37 in) long. Flowering occurs from August to May, and the fruit is a woody, densely hairy, flattened elliptic pod, 9–12.6 mm (0.35–0.50 in) long and about 3.2–4 mm (0.13–0.16 in) wide.

== Taxonomy ==
Jacksonia elongata was first formally described in 2007 by Jennifer Anne Chappill in Australian Systematic Botany from specimens collected in 1991. The specific epithet (elongata) means 'elongated', referring to the stems.

== Distribution and habitat ==
This species of Jacksonia grows in dense shrubland in sand in the Fitzgerald River National Park and east to Munglinup in the Esperance Plains bioregion of southern Western Australia.

== Conservation status ==
Jacksonia elongata is listed as "not threatened" by the Government of Western Australia Department of Biodiversity, Conservation and Attractions.
