= Jacksonia quinkanensis =

Scientific classification
- Kingdom: Plantae
- Clade: Tracheophytes
- Clade: Angiosperms
- Clade: Eudicots
- Clade: Rosids
- Order: Fabales
- Family: Fabaceae
- Subfamily: Faboideae
- Genus: Jacksonia
- Species: J. quinkanensis

Binomial name
- Jacksonia quinkanensis Chappill

Species of legume

Jacksonia quinkanensis is a species of flowering plant in the family Fabaceae and is endemic to Queensland. It is an erect, delicate, densely branching shrub, the end branches phylloclades, the leaves reduced to egg-shaped scale leaves, the flowers yellow-orange, and the fruit a woody, densely hairy pod.

== Description ==
Jacksonia quinkanensis is an erect, delicate, densely branched shrub that typically grows up to 0.1–1.2 m (3.9 in – 3 ft 11.2 in) high and 1–2 m (3 ft 3 in – 6 ft 7 in) wide, its branches yellowish-green, the end branches phylloclades. Its leaves are reduced to mid-brown, egg-shaped scales, 0.3–0.7 mm (0.012–0.028 in) long, 0.2–0.8 mm (0.0079–0.0315 in) wide. The flowers are sparsely arranged along the branches, each flower on a pedicel 1.0–1.4 mm (0.039–0.055 in) long. There are broadly egg-shaped bracteoles 0.5–1 mm (0.020–0.039 in) long and 0.4–0.6 mm (0.016–0.024 in) wide on the pedicels. The floral tube is 1.1–1.7 mm (0.043–0.067 in) long and ribbed, the sepals membranous, the upper lobes 2.3–2.7 mm (0.091–0.106 in) long and 1.1–1.4 mm (0.043–0.055 in) wide and fused at the base for 0.8–1.0 mm (0.031–0.039 in), the lower lobes longer and narrower. The petals are yellow-orange, the standard petal 2.8–3.2 mm (0.11–0.13 in) long and 2.7–2.7 mm (0.11–0.11 in) deep, the wings 4.0–4.4 mm (0.16–0.17 in) long, and the keel 4.0–4.2 mm (0.16–0.17 in) long. The stamens have red filaments 2.7–4.7 mm (0.11–0.19 in) long. Flowering occurs from February to October, and the fruit is a woody, elliptic pod, 4.2–4.7 mm (0.17–0.19 in) long, 2.0–2.1 mm (0.079–0.083 in) wide and densely covered with white hairs pressed against the surface.

== Taxonomy ==
Jacksonia quinkanensis was first formally described in 2007 by Jennifer Anne Chappill in Australian Systematic Botany from specimens collected on Peninsula Developmental Road about 8.5 km (5.3 mi) from Laura. The specific epithet (quinkanensis) refers to the primary area of distribution in Quinkan country.

== Distribution and habitat ==
This species of Jacksonia grows in woodland on yellow or red sand over sandstone, mostly in Quinkan country near Laura.

== Conservation status ==
Jacksonia quinkanensis is listed as of "least concern" under the Nature Conservation Act in Queensland.
