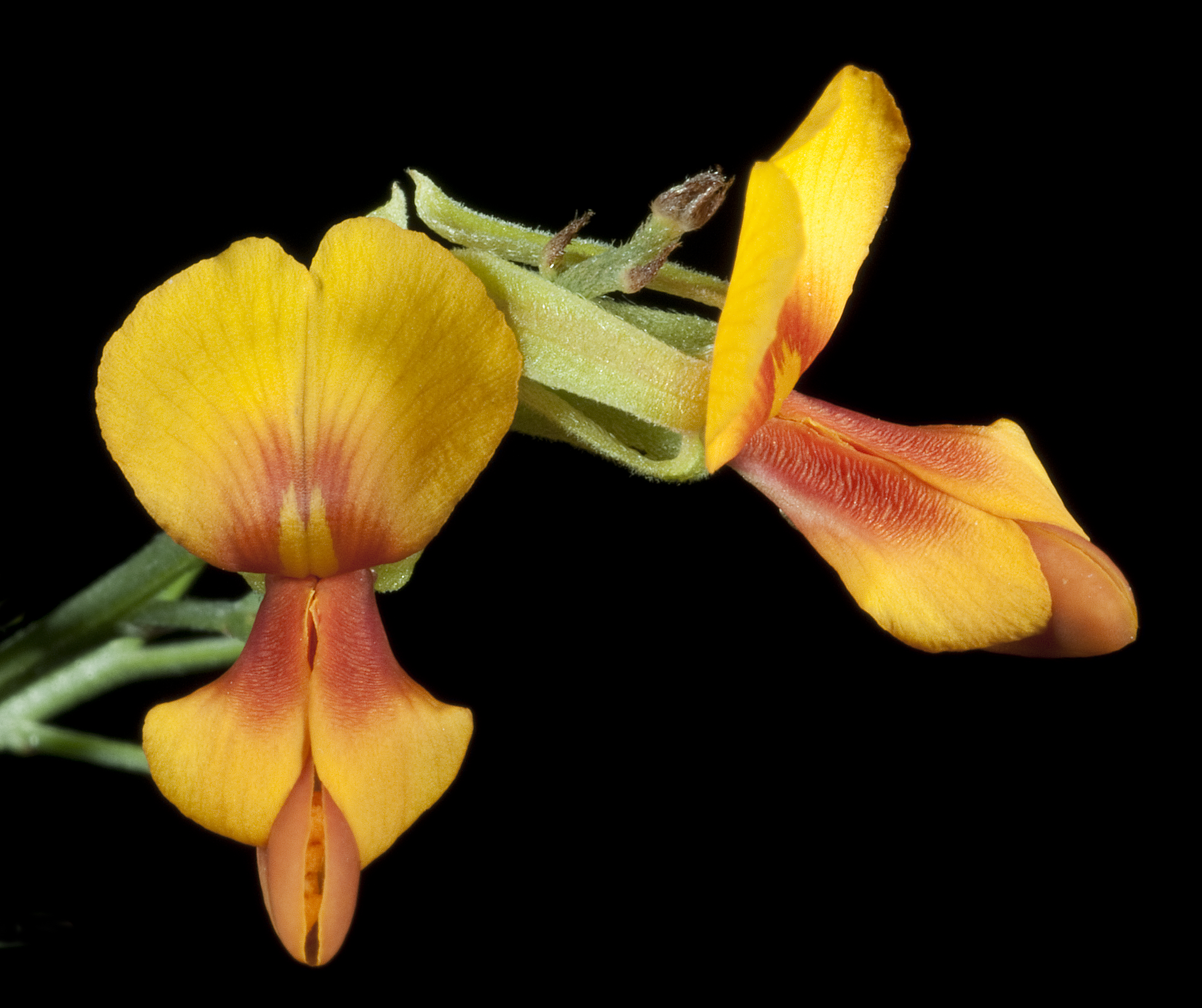

Conservation status
- Priority Three — Poorly Known Taxa (DEC)

Scientific classification
- Kingdom: Plantae
- Clade: Tracheophytes
- Clade: Angiosperms
- Clade: Eudicots
- Clade: Rosids
- Order: Fabales
- Family: Fabaceae
- Subfamily: Faboideae
- Genus: Jacksonia
- Species: J. gracillima

Binomial name
- Jacksonia gracillima Chappill

= Jacksonia gracillima =

Species of legume

Jacksonia gracillima is a species of flowering plant in the family Fabaceae and is endemic to the south-west of Western Australia. It is a low, spreading, compact shrub with greyish-green branches, yellow to yellow-orange or orange-red flowers with red markings, and woody, densely-hairy pods.

== Description ==
Jacksonia gracillima is a low spreading, compact shrub and that typically grows up to 0.1–1 m (3.9 in – 3 ft 3.4 in) high and 0.1–1.5 m (3.9 in – 4 ft 11.1 in) wide, its branches greyish-green and ribbed. Its end branches are sharply-pointed, 3.5–7 mm (0.14–0.28 in) long and 1.0–1.5 mm (0.039–0.059 in) wide and its leaves are reduced to pale brown, triangular scales, 0.5–1.0 mm (0.020–0.039 in) long and 0.6–1.3 mm (0.024–0.051 in) wide with toothed edges. The flowers are borne in racemes on the ends of branches, each flower on a pedicel 3.0–4.5 mm (0.12–0.18 in) long. There are egg-shaped bracteoles 0.7–1.5 mm (0.028–0.059 in) long and 0.5–0.8 mm (0.020–0.031 in) wide on the pedicels. The floral tube is 0.8–1.0 mm (0.031–0.039 in) long and the sepals are membranous, the lobes 8.3–10 mm (0.33–0.39 in) long, 2.0–2.8 mm (0.079–0.110 in) wide and fused at the base. The standard petal is yellow to yellow-orange or orange-red with red markings, 8.5–9.7 mm (0.33–0.38 in) long and 10.0–10.5 mm (0.39–0.41 in) deep, the wings yellow, yellow-orange to orange-red with red markings, 6.3–8.0 mm (0.25–0.31 in) long, and the keel is red, 6.0–7.5 mm (0.24–0.30 in) long. The stamens have white filaments with a red tip, 6.3–9.3 mm (0.25–0.37 in) long. Flowering occurs in October and November, and the fruit is a woody, densely hairy, broadly oval pod, 6.3–7.0 mm (0.25–0.28 in) long and 3.5–4.0 mm (0.14–0.16 in) wide.

== Taxonomy ==
Jacksonia gracillima was first formally described in 2007 by Jennifer Anne Chappill in Australian Systematic Botany from specimens collected by Michael Hislop at Forrestfield in 1998. The specific epithet (gracillima) means 'very thin' or 'very slender'.

== Distribution and habitat ==
This species of Jacksonia grows in shrubland in peaty sand between the suburbs of Perth and Busselton in the Swan Coastal Plain bioregion of southern Western Australia.

== Conservation status ==
Jacksonia gracillima is listed as "Priority Three" by the Government of Western Australia Department of Parks and Wildlife, meaning that it is poorly known and known from only a few locations but is not under imminent threat.
