= Jacksonia divisa =

Scientific classification
- Kingdom: Plantae
- Clade: Tracheophytes
- Clade: Angiosperms
- Clade: Eudicots
- Clade: Rosids
- Order: Fabales
- Family: Fabaceae
- Subfamily: Faboideae
- Genus: Jacksonia
- Species: J. divisa

Binomial name
- Jacksonia divisa Chappill

Species of legume

Jacksonia divisa is a species of flowering plant in the family Fabaceae and is endemic to a restricted part of Kakadu National Park. It is an erect, densely branching shrub, its end branches flattened, hairy, leaf-like phylloclades, its leaves reduced to broadly lance-shaped scales, with yellow flowers, and woody, hairy pods.

== Description ==
Jacksonia divisa is an erect, densely branching shrub, that typically grows up to 1.5–3 m (4 ft 11 in – 9 ft 10 in) high and 0.5–1 m (1 ft 8 in – 3 ft 3 in) wide, its branches greyish-green. Its end branches are narrowly wedge-shaped, 15–58 mm (0.59–2.28 in) long and 3.5–18 mm (0.14–0.71 in) wide with forked tips. The leaves are reduced to broadly lance-shaped, reddish-brown scales, 5.5–10 mm (0.22–0.39 in) long and 1.0–1.8 mm (0.039–0.071 in) wide. The flowers are clustered in the axils of phylloclades, each flower on a pedicel 1.5–3 mm (0.059–0.118 in) long. There are lance-shaped bracteoles 5.3–9.5 mm (0.21–0.37 in) long and 1.2–2.2 mm (0.047–0.087 in) wide at the base of the floral tube. The floral tube is 1.3–1.5 mm (0.051–0.059 in) long and the sepals are membranous, the lobes 7.2–8.3 mm (0.28–0.33 in) long and 1.7–2.1 mm (0.067–0.083 in) wide. The flowers are yellow, the standard petal is 8.5–11.9 mm (0.33–0.47 in) long and 11–14.6 mm (0.43–0.57 in) deep, the wings 7.0–7.4 mm (0.28–0.29 in) long, and the keel 4.5–4.8 mm (0.18–0.19 in) long. The stamens have red filaments 2.0–5.7 mm (0.079–0.224 in) long. Flowering occurs from April to June, and the fruit is a woody, hairy, flattened, broadly elliptic pod, 9.0–9.5 mm (0.35–0.37 in) long and 3.8–4.0 mm (0.15–0.16 in) wide.

== Taxonomy ==
Jacksonia divisa was first formally described in 2007 by Jennifer Anne Chappill in Australian Systematic Botany from specimens collected near Bloomfield Springs in Kakadu National Park. The specific epithet (divisa) means 'divided', referring to the tips of the phylloclades.

== Distribution and habitat ==
This species of Jacksonia is only known from near the type location, where it grows on a sandy ledge of a sandstone escarpment in the Pine Creek bioregion of Kakadu National Park.

== Conservation status ==
Jacksonia divisa is listed as "vulnerable" under the Northern Territory Government Territory Parks and Wildlife Conservation Act.
