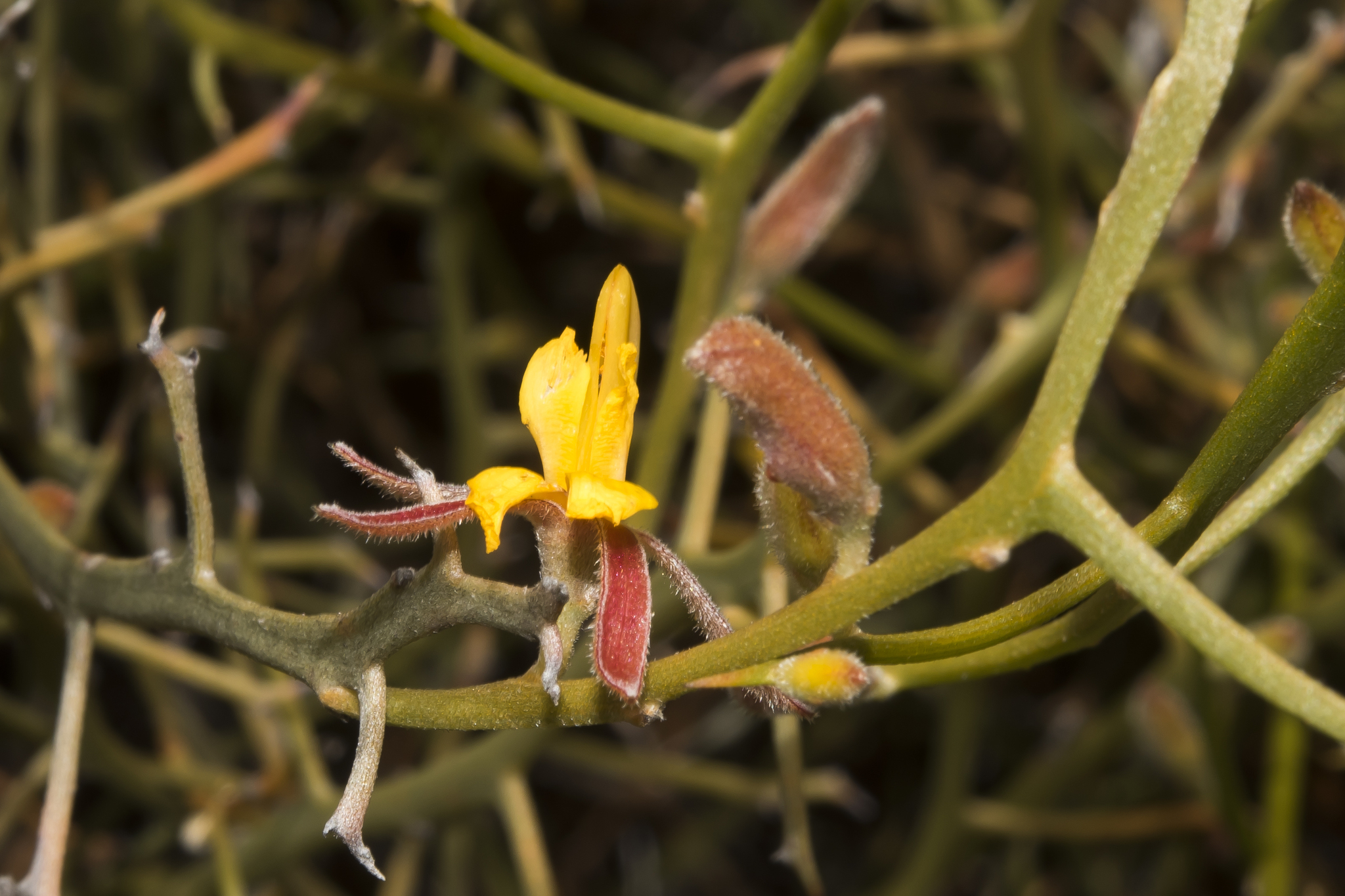
- In Tarin Rock Nature Reserve

Scientific classification
- Kingdom: Plantae
- Clade: Tracheophytes
- Clade: Angiosperms
- Clade: Eudicots
- Clade: Rosids
- Order: Fabales
- Family: Fabaceae
- Subfamily: Faboideae
- Genus: Jacksonia
- Species: J. tarinensis

Binomial name
- Jacksonia tarinensis Chappill

= Jacksonia tarinensis =

Species of legume

Jacksonia tarinensis is a species of flowering plant in the family Fabaceae and is endemic to a small area in the south-west of Western Australia. It is a spreading or erect, domed shrub with greyish-green branches, the end branches sharply-pointed cladodes, leaves reduced to dark brown, egg-shaped scales with toothed edges, yellow-orange flowers with red marking scattered along the branches, and woody, densely hairy, elliptic pods.

== Description ==
Jacksonia tarinensis is a spreading or erect, domed shrub that typically grows up to 0.4–1 m (1 ft 4 in – 3 ft 3 in) high and 0.5–1.5 m (1 ft 8 in – 4 ft 11 in) wide. It has greyish-green branches, the end branches sharply-pointed cladodes, its leaves reduced to egg-shaped, dark brown scales, 0.7–2.2 mm (0.028–0.087 in) long and 0.7–1.6 mm (0.028–0.063 in) wide with toothed edges. The flowers are scattered along the branches on pedicels 1.5–3.3 mm (0.059–0.130 in) long, with golden-brown, oval bracts 9.5–14.5 mm (0.37–0.57 in) long, 2.3–4.5 mm (0.091–0.177 in) wide and egg-shaped bracteoles 0.8–1.4 mm (0.031–0.055 in) long and 0.8–0.9 mm (0.031–0.035 in) wide. The floral tube is 1.0–1.5 mm (0.039–0.059 in) long and not ribbed, and the sepals are membranous, with lobes 8.0–8.5 mm (0.31–0.33 in) long, 1–2 mm (0.039–0.079 in) wide and fused for 0.7–0.8 mm (0.028–0.031 in). The standard petal is yellow-orange with a red "eye", 5.1–8 mm (0.20–0.31 in) long and 6.2 mm (0.24 in) deep, the wings yellow-orange with orange-red markings, 6.5–7.3 mm (0.26–0.29 in) long, and the keel is orange-red, 6.3–7.3 mm (0.25–0.29 in) long. The stamens have green or white filaments with a red tip, 5.6–8.1 mm (0.22–0.32 in) long. Flowering occurs from July to January, and the fruit is a woody, elliptic, densely hairy pod 8.5–9.0 mm (0.33–0.35 in) long and 4.0–4.5 mm (0.16–0.18 in) wide.

== Taxonomy ==
Jacksonia tarinensis was first formally described in 2007 by Jennifer Anne Chappill in Australian Systematic Botany from specimens collected on Holden Road, 1.2 km (0.75 mi) east of Pearce Road in 1991. The specific epithet (tarinensis) means 'native of Tarin Rock'.

== Distribution and habitat ==
This species of Jacksonia grows in dense shrubland and is only known from near Tarin Rock in the Avon Wheatbelt and Mallee bioregions of south-western Western Australia.

== Conservation status ==
Jacksonia tarinensis is listed as "not threatened" by the Government of Western Australia Department of Biodiversity, Conservation and Attractions.
