= Jacksonia remota =

Conservation status
- Priority Two — Poorly Known Taxa (DEC)

Scientific classification
- Kingdom: Plantae
- Clade: Tracheophytes
- Clade: Angiosperms
- Clade: Eudicots
- Clade: Rosids
- Order: Fabales
- Family: Fabaceae
- Subfamily: Faboideae
- Genus: Jacksonia
- Species: J. remota

Binomial name
- Jacksonia remota Chappill

Species of legume

Jacksonia remota is a species of flowering plant in the family Fabaceae and is endemic to northern Australia. It is an erect to spreading shrub with greyish-green branches, the end branches sharply-pointed phylloclades, leaves reduced to reddish-brown, egg-shaped scales, yellow-orange flowers, and membranous, densely hairy, elliptic pods.

== Description ==
Jacksonia remota is an erected to spreading shrub that typically grows up to 0.1–2 m (3.9 in – 6 ft 6.7 in) high and 0.5–1.8 m (1 ft 8 in – 5 ft 11 in) wide. It has greyish-green branches, the end branches sharply-pointed phylloclades, its leaves reduced to egg-shaped, reddish-brown scales, 1.3–3.7 mm (0.051–0.146 in) long and 0.8–1.5 mm (0.031–0.059 in) wide with toothed edges. The flowers are arranged singly on the phylloclades on a pedicel 1.8–3.5 mm (0.071–0.138 in) long, with lance-shaped bracteoles 1.5–2.9 mm (0.059–0.114 in) long, 0.75–1.1 mm (0.030–0.043 in) wide with toothed edges. The floral tube is 0.5–0.7 mm (0.020–0.028 in) long and not ribbed, and the sepals are membranous, with lobes 10–12.8 mm (0.39–0.50 in) long, 3.8–8.4 mm (0.15–0.33 in) wide and fused for 1.5–2.0 mm (0.059–0.079 in). The flowers are yellow-orange, the standard petal 5.5–5.9 mm (0.22–0.23 in) long and 7.6–8 mm (0.30–0.31 in) deep, the wings 5.5–6.0 mm (0.22–0.24 in) long, and the keel 5.6–6.0 mm (0.22–0.24 in) long. The stamens have red filaments, 5–8 mm (0.20–0.31 in) long. Flowering occurs from April to July, and the fruit is an elliptic, membranous, densely hairy pod 5.0–6.2 mm (0.20–0.24 in) long and 3.5–4.6 mm (0.14–0.18 in) wide.

== Taxonomy ==
Jacksonia remota was first formally described in 2007 by Jennifer Anne Chappill in Australian Systematic Botany from specimens collected in Kakadu National Park in 1990. The specific epithet (remota) means 'distant' or 'remote'.

== Distribution and habitat ==
This species of Jacksonia grows in shrubland or woodland on sandstone, quartz, kaolinite or laterite in southern Kakadu National Park and Nitmiluk National Park in the Northern Territory and in King Creek Gorge in the Kimberley in the north of Western Australia.

== Conservation status ==
Jacksonia remota is listed as "Priority Two" by the Government of Western Australia Department of Biodiversity, Conservation and Attractions, meaning that it is poorly known and from one or a few locations. The species is listed as of "least concern" under the Northern Territory Government Territory Parks and Wildlife Conservation Act.
