= Jacksonia flexuosa =

Scientific classification
- Kingdom: Plantae
- Clade: Tracheophytes
- Clade: Angiosperms
- Clade: Eudicots
- Clade: Rosids
- Order: Fabales
- Family: Fabaceae
- Subfamily: Faboideae
- Genus: Jacksonia
- Species: J. flexuosa

Binomial name
- Jacksonia flexuosa Chappill

Species of legume

Jacksonia flexuosa is a species of flowering plant in the family Fabaceae and is endemic to a restricted part of the Northern Territory. It is an erect, densely branching shrub, the end branches short, zig-zagged and scattered along the branches and densely hairy, the leaves reduced to sharply-pointed scale leaves, the flowers yellow, and the fruit is a woody, densely hairy pod.

== Description ==
Jacksonia flexuosa is an erect, densely branched, soft shrub that typically grows up to 1–2 m (3 ft 3 in – 6 ft 7 in) high and 0.5–1.5 m (1 ft 8 in – 4 ft 11 in) wide, its branches greyish-green, the end branches short and zig-zagged, densely hairy, 3.5–12 mm (0.14–0.47 in) long and 0.4–0.7 mm (0.016–0.028 in) wide. Its leaves are reduced to egg-shaped scales, 0.7–1.7 mm (0.028–0.067 in) long, 0.3–0.6 mm (0.012–0.024 in) wide and sharply pointed. The flowers are arranged near the tips of the branches, each flower on a pedicel 1–2 mm (0.039–0.079 in) long. There are narrowly egg-shaped bracteoles 1.0–1.6 mm (0.039–0.063 in) long and 0.4–0.6 mm (0.016–0.024 in) wide on the pedicels. The floral tube is 1.1–1.4 mm (0.043–0.055 in) long and not ribbed. The sepals are membranous, the upper lobes 3.7 mm (0.15 in) long and 1.0–1.6 mm (0.039–0.063 in) wide and fused at the base for 3.1–3.8 mm (0.12–0.15 in), the lower lobes longer and narrower. The petals are yellow, the standard petal 4.2–5.2 mm (0.17–0.20 in) long and 5.9–6.0 mm (0.23–0.24 in) deep, the wings 5.1–5.8 mm (0.20–0.23 in) long, and the keel 5.1–6.0 mm (0.20–0.24 in) long. The stamens have green filaments 2.9–5.3 mm (0.11–0.21 in) long. Flowering occurs from April to June, and the fruit is a woody, elliptic pod, 3.8–4.0 mm (0.15–0.16 in) long, 1.6–1.8 mm (0.063–0.071 in) wide and densely covered with white hairs.

== Taxonomy ==
Jacksonia flexuosa was first formally described in 2007 by Jennifer Anne Chappill in Australian Systematic Botany from specimens collected east of Narbarlek in Arnhem Land in 1992. The specific epithet (flexuosa) means 'flexuose' or 'zig-zagged', because this species differs from J. pendens in its strongly zig-zagged branches.

== Distribution and habitat ==
This species of Jacksonia grows in woodland and is only known from near Nabarlek.

== Conservation status ==
Jacksonia flexuose is listed as "not threatened" in the Territory Parks and Wildlife Conservation Act.
