= Jacksonia quairading =

Conservation status
- Endangered (EPBC Act)

Scientific classification
- Kingdom: Plantae
- Clade: Tracheophytes
- Clade: Angiosperms
- Clade: Eudicots
- Clade: Rosids
- Order: Fabales
- Family: Fabaceae
- Subfamily: Faboideae
- Genus: Jacksonia
- Species: J. quairading

Binomial name
- Jacksonia quairading Chappill

Species of legume

Jacksonia quairading, commonly known as Quairading stinkwood, is a species of flowering plant in the family Fabaceae and is endemic to a restricted area in the south-west of Western Australia. It is a low-lying, straggling shrub with greyish-green branches, the end branchlets sharply-pointed, the leaves reduced to dark brown, egg-shaped scales, orange flowers with red markings, and woody, densely hairy, flattened elliptic pods.

== Description ==
Jacksonia quairading is a low-lying, straggling shrub that typically grows up to 20–30 cm (7.9–11.8 in) high and 0.3–1.5 m (1 ft 0 in – 4 ft 11 in) wide. It has greyish-green branches, sharply-pointed branchlets 7–13 mm (0.28–0.51 in) long and 0.8–1.2 mm (0.031–0.047 in) wide, its leaves reduced to egg-shaped, dark brown scales, 0.5–1.4 mm (0.020–0.055 in) long and 0.4–0.8 mm (0.016–0.031 in) wide. The flowers are scattered on the branchlets on pedicels 2–4.2 mm (0.079–0.165 in) long, with egg-shaped bracteoles 0.9–1.5 mm (0.035–0.059 in) long and 0.55–1.0 mm (0.022–0.039 in) wide. The floral tube is 1.3–1.6 mm (0.051–0.063 in) long and the sepals are membranous, with lobes 7.5–11 mm (0.30–0.43 in) long, 1.7–2.0 mm (0.067–0.079 in) wide and fused for 0.6–0.7 mm (0.024–0.028 in). The standard petal is orange with red markings, 8–9 mm (0.31–0.35 in) long and 8.1–14 mm (0.32–0.55 in) deep, the wings orange with red markings 7.3–9.5 mm (0.29–0.37 in) long, and the keel is red, 7.6–8.7 mm (0.30–0.34 in) long. The stamens have dark red filaments 5.0–9.8 mm (0.20–0.39 in) long. Flowering occurs from August to December, and the fruit is a flattened elliptic, woody, densely hairy pod 6.5–7.0 mm (0.26–0.28 in) long and 5.5–5.6 mm (0.22–0.22 in) wide.

== Taxonomy ==
Jacksonia quairading was first formally described in 2007 by Jennifer Anne Chappill in Australian Systematic Botany from specimens collected by Chappill and Carolyn F. Wilkins east of Quairading in 1991. The specific epithet (quairading) refers to the distribution of the species. referring to the long, pungent branchlets.

== Distribution and habitat ==
This species of Jacksonia grows in shrubland on sandy soil or laterite and is only known from near Quairading in the Avon Wheatbelt bioregion of south-western Western Australia.

== Conservation status ==
Jacksonia quairading is listed as is listed as "endangered" under the Australian Government Environment Protection and Biodiversity Conservation Act 1999 and as "Threatened Flora (Declared Rare Flora — Extant)" by the Government of Western Australia Department of Biodiversity, Conservation and Attractions. The main threats to the species are firebreak and track maintenance, recreational activities, inappropriate fire regimes and invasive weeds.
