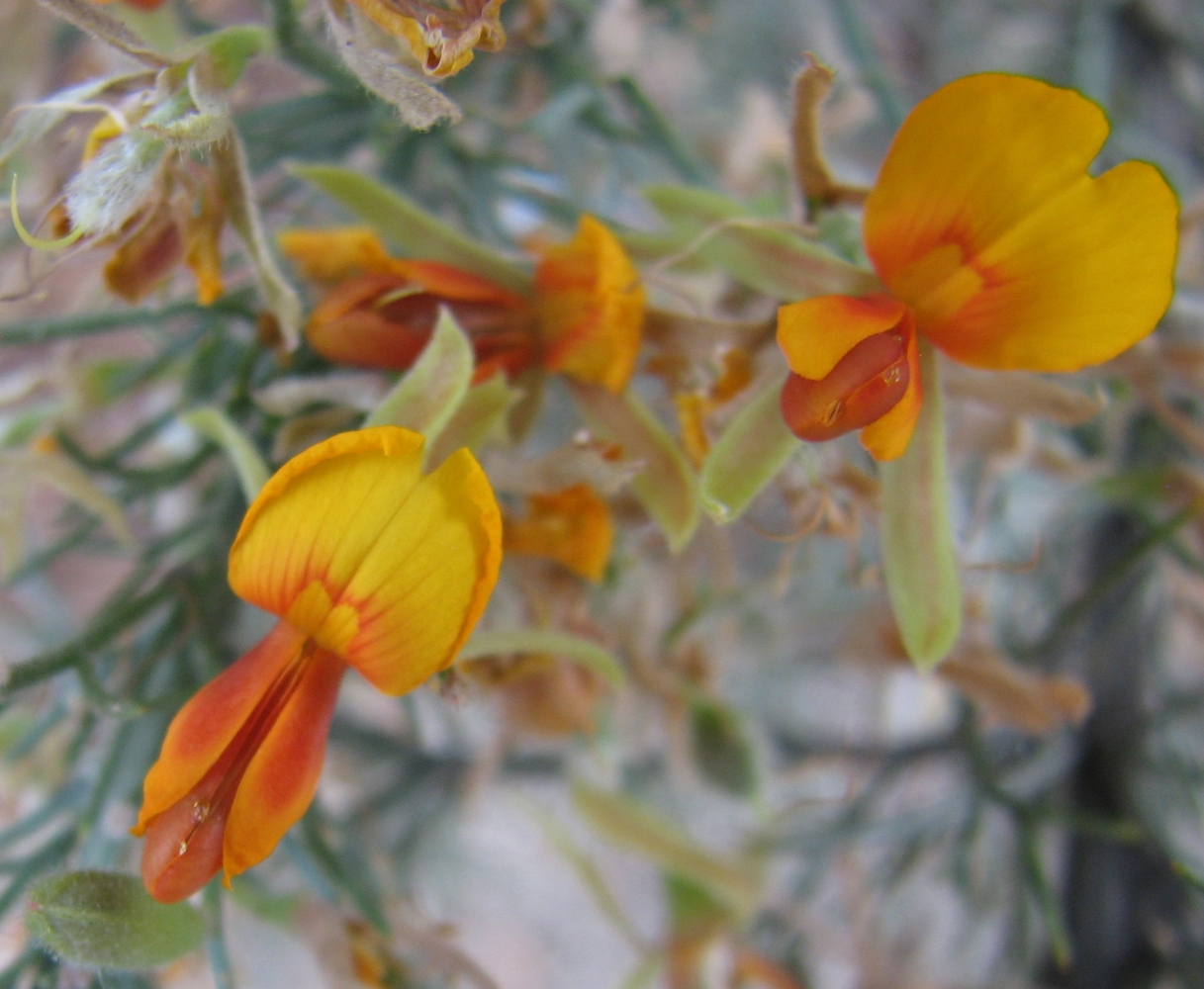
- Jacksonia furcellata

Scientific classification
- Kingdom: Plantae
- Clade: Tracheophytes
- Clade: Angiosperms
- Clade: Eudicots
- Clade: Rosids
- Order: Fabales
- Family: Fabaceae
- Subfamily: Faboideae
- Clade: Mirbelioids
- Genus: Jacksonia; R.Br. ex Sm.

Species
- See text

Synonyms
- Acksonia W.Fitzg. orth. var.; Piptomeris Turcz.

= Jacksonia (plant) =

Genus of legumes

Jacksonia is a genus of about 73 species of mostly leafless, broom-like shrubs or small trees in the flowering plant family Fabaceae. The genus is endemic to Australia and species occur in a range of habitats in all Australian states except Victoria, South Australia and Tasmania, and in the Northern Territory.

== Description ==
Plants in the genus Jacksonia are mostly leafless shrubs or small trees with rigid branches, and leaves reduced to small scales. The flowers are arranged in spikes or racemes with small bracts or bracteoles. The sepals are joined to form a short tube and the petals are usually shorter than the sepals. The standard or banner petal is circular or kidney-shaped, the wing petals are oblong and the keel petal is more or less straight and wider than the wings.

== Taxonomy ==
The genus Jacksonia was first formally described by James Edward Smith from an unpublished manuscript by Robert Brown. Smith's description was published in 1811 in Rees's Cyclopædia along with a description of J. scoparia and J. spinosa. Smith noted that Brown had named the species "in memory of the late Mr. George Jackson, F.L.S., a man of the most excellent and amiable character, devoted to the science of botany". Jackson had died suddenly at the age of 31, in January of the same year.

=== Accepted species ===
The following is a list of Jacksonia species accepted by the Australian Plant Census as at December 2023:

- Jacksonia acicularis Chappill (W.A.)
- Jacksonia aculeata W.Fitzg. (W.A., N.T.)
- Jacksonia alata Benth. (W.A.)
- Jacksonia angulata Benth. (W.A.)
- Jacksonia anthoclada Chappill (W.A.)
- Jacksonia arenicola Chappill (W.A.)
- Jacksonia argentea C.A.Gardner (W.A.)
- Jacksonia arida Chappill (W.A.)
- Jacksonia arnhemica Chappill (N.T.)
- Jacksonia calcicola Chappill (W.A.)
- Jacksonia calycina Domin (W.A.)
- Jacksonia capitata Benth. (W.A.)
- Jacksonia carduacea Meisn. (W.A.)
- Jacksonia chappilliae C.F.Wilkins (N.S.W.)
- Jacksonia compressa Turcz. (W.A.)
- Jacksonia condensata Crisp & J.R.Wheeler (W.A.)
- Jacksonia cupulifera Meisn. (W.A.)
- Jacksonia debilis Chappill (W.A.)
- Jacksonia dendrospinosa Chappill (W.A.)
- Jacksonia dilatata Benth. (N.T., Qld.)
- Jacksonia divisa Chappill (N.T.)
- Jacksonia effusa Chappill (N.T.)
- Jacksonia elongata Chappill (W.A.)
- Jacksonia epiphyllum Chappill (W.A.)
- Jacksonia eremodendron E.Pritz. (W.A.)
- Jacksonia fasciculata Meisn. (W.A.)
- Jacksonia flexuosa Chappill (N.T.)
- Jacksonia floribunda Endl. – holly pea (W.A.)
- Jacksonia foliosa Turcz. (W.A.)
- Jacksonia forrestii F.Muell. – broom bush (W.A., N.T.)
- Jacksonia furcellata (Bonpl.) DC. — grey stinkwood (W.A.)
- Jacksonia gracillima Chappill (W.A.)
- Jacksonia grevilleoides Turcz. (W.A.)
- Jacksonia hakeoides Meisn. (W.A.)
- Jacksonia horrida DC. (W.A.)
- Jacksonia humilis Chappill (W.A.)
- Jacksonia intricata Chappill (W.A.)
- Jacksonia jackson Chappill (W.A.)
- Jacksonia lanicarpa Chappill (W.A.)
- Jacksonia lateritica Chappill (Qld, N.T.)
- Jacksonia lehmannii Meisn. (W.A.)
- Jacksonia macrocalyx Meisn. (W.A.)
- Jacksonia nematoclada F.Muell. (W.A.)
- Jacksonia nutans Chappill (W.A.)
- Jacksonia odontoclada F.Muell. ex Benth. (W.A., N.T., Qld.)
- Jacksonia pendens Chappill (N.T.)
- Jacksonia pungens Chappill (W.A.)
- Jacksonia quairading Chappill (W.A.)
- Jacksonia quinkanensis Chappill (Qld.)
- Jacksonia racemosa Meisn. (W.A.)
- Jacksonia ramosissima Benth. (Qld.)
- Jacksonia ramulosa Chappill (W.A.)
- Jacksonia reclinata Chappill (N.T.)
- Jacksonia remota Chappill (W.A., N.T.)
- Jacksonia restioides Meisn. (W.A.)
- Jacksonia rhadinoclada F.Muell. (W.A.)
- Jacksonia rhadinoclona F.Muell. (Qld., N.S.W.)
- Jacksonia rigida Chappill (W.A.)
- Jacksonia rubra Chappill (W.A.)
- Jacksonia rupestris Chappill (W.A.)
- Jacksonia scoparia R.Br. — dogwood, winged broom-pea (Qld., N.S.W.)
- Jacksonia sericea Benth. — waldjumi (W.A.)
- Jacksonia spicata Chappill (N.T.)
- Jacksonia spinosa (Labill.) R.Br. ex Sm. (W.A.)
- Jacksonia stackhousei F.Muell. – wallum dogwood (Qld., N.S.W.)
- Jacksonia stellaris Chappill (N.T.)
- Jacksonia sternbergiana Hügel ex Benth. — stinkwood (W.A.)
- Jacksonia tarinensis Chappill (W.A.)
- Jacksonia thesioides A.Cunn. ex Benth. (Qld.)
- Jacksonia velutina Benth. (W.A.)
- Jacksonia venosa Chappill (W.A.)
- Jacksonia velveta Chappill (W.A.)
- Jacksonia vernicosa F.Muell. ex Benth. (N.T., Qld.)
