= Jacksonia lanicarpa =

Conservation status
- Priority One — Poorly Known Taxa (DEC)

Scientific classification
- Kingdom: Plantae
- Clade: Tracheophytes
- Clade: Angiosperms
- Clade: Eudicots
- Clade: Rosids
- Order: Fabales
- Family: Fabaceae
- Subfamily: Faboideae
- Genus: Jacksonia
- Species: J. lanicarpa

Binomial name
- Jacksonia lanicarpa Chappill

Species of legume

Jacksonia lanicarpa is a species of flowering plant in the family Fabaceae and is endemic to inland Western Australia. It is an erect shrub with yellow to greyish-green branches, leaves reduced to egg-shaped scales, yellow-orange flowers, and woody, densely hairy pods.

== Description ==
Jacksonia lanicarpa is an erect shrub that typically grows up to 0.6–4 m (2 ft 0 in – 13 ft 1 in) high and 1.5 m (4 ft 11 in) wide. It has yellow to greyish-green branches, the end branches phylloclades, its leaves reduced to egg-shaped, dark brown scales, 0.6–1.3 mm (0.024–0.051 in) long and 0.5–0.9 mm (0.020–0.035 in) wide but fall off as they mature. The flowers are arranged singly at the ends of branches on a pedicel 3.1–5 mm (0.12–0.20 in) long, with lance-shaped bracteoles 1.2–2 mm (0.047–0.079 in) long and 0.45–0.60 mm (0.018–0.024 in) wide but that fall off as the flowers open. The floral tube is about 1.5 mm (0.059 in) long and the sepals are membranous, with lobes 4.6–6.2 mm (0.18–0.24 in) long and 1.5–1.6 mm (0.059–0.063 in) wide and fused for 1.0–1.5 mm (0.039–0.059 in). The flowers are yellow-orange, the standard petal 6.5–7.1 mm (0.26–0.28 in) long and 8 mm (0.31 in) deep, the wings about 7.8 mm (0.31 in) long, and the keel, about 7.1 mm (0.28 in) long. The stamens have pink filaments and 4.5–7.5 mm (0.18–0.30 in) long. Flowering occurs from October to December, and the fruit is a woody, densely hairy pod about 5.2 mm (0.20 in) long and 23.6 mm (0.93 in) wide.

== Taxonomy ==
Jacksonia lanicarpa was first formally described in 2007 by Jennifer Anne Chappill in Australian Systematic Botany from specimens collected near Mount Magnet in 1996. The specific epithet (lanicarpa) means 'wool-fruited', referring to the long, spreading hairs on the fruit.

== Distribution and habitat ==
This species of Jacksonia grows in open shrubland on red sand, and is only known from near Cue and Cundeelee in the Coolgardie and Murchison bioregions of inland Western Australia.

== Conservation status ==
Jacksonia lanicarpa is listed as "Priority One" by the Government of Western Australia Department of Biodiversity, Conservation and Attractions, meaning that it is known from only one or a few locations where it is potentially at risk.
