= Jacksonia jackson =

Conservation status
- Priority One — Poorly Known Taxa (DEC)

Scientific classification
- Kingdom: Plantae
- Clade: Tracheophytes
- Clade: Angiosperms
- Clade: Eudicots
- Clade: Rosids
- Order: Fabales
- Family: Fabaceae
- Subfamily: Faboideae
- Genus: Jacksonia
- Species: J. jackson

Binomial name
- Jacksonia jackson Chappill

Species of legume

Jacksonia jackson is a species of flowering plant in the family Fabaceae and is endemic to inland Western Australia. It is an erect, spindly, spreading shrub with dull green branches, the end branches sharply-pointed phylloclades, leaves reduced to egg-shaped scales, yellow-orange flowers with red markings, and woody, densely hairy pods.

== Description ==
Jacksonia jackson is an erect, spindly, spreading shrub that typically grows up to 25–35 cm (9.8–13.8 in) high and 0.3–100 cm (0.12–39.37 in) wide. It has ribbed, flattened branches, the side branches sharply-pointed phylloclades, its leaves are reduced to egg-shaped, dark brown scales, 1.3–2.8 mm (0.051–0.110 in) long and 1.2–2.0 mm (0.047–0.079 in) wide. The flowers are arranged at the ends of main stems or on short side branches, in raceme-like clusters, each flower on a pedicel 1.3–1.6 mm (0.051–0.063 in) long, with egg-shaped bracteoles 1.2–2.7 mm (0.047–0.106 in) long and 0.65–0.85 mm (0.026–0.033 in) wide near the top of the pedicels. The floral tube is 1–2 mm (0.039–0.079 in) long and the sepals are membranous, with lobes 5.0–8.5 mm (0.20–0.33 in) long and 2.0–3.3 mm (0.079–0.130 in) wide. The standard petal is yellow-orange with a red "eye", 4–8 mm (0.16–0.31 in) long and 4.0–11.5 mm (0.16–0.45 in) deep, the wings yellow-orange with red markings, 5.7–6.2 mm (0.22–0.24 in) long, and the keel is yellow-orange with red markings, 5.5–5.7 mm (0.22–0.22 in) long. The stamens have pink filaments with a white tip and are 3.9–7 mm (0.15–0.28 in) long. Flowering occurs from July to November, and the fruit is a woody, densely hairy pod 3.5–5.0 mm (0.14–0.20 in) long and 2.7–2.8 mm (0.11–0.11 in) wide.

== Taxonomy ==
Jacksonia jackson was first formally described in 2007 by Jennifer Anne Chappill in Australian Systematic Botany from specimens collected near an abandoned mine near Mount Jackson in 1991. The specific epithet (jackson) refers to the type location.

== Distribution and habitat ==
This species of Jacksonia grows in woodland near the type location in the Coolgardie bioregion of inland Western Australia.

== Conservation status ==
Jacksonia jackson is listed as "Priority One" by the Government of Western Australia Department of Biodiversity, Conservation and Attractions, meaning that it is known from only one or a few locations where it is potentially at risk.
