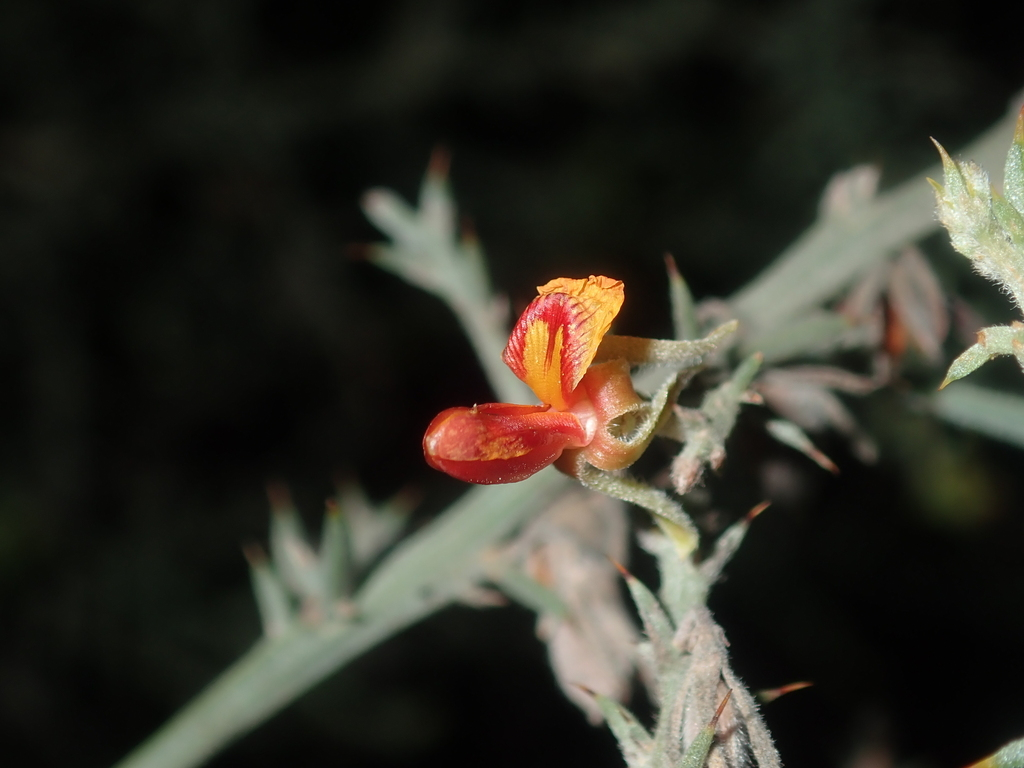

Scientific classification
- Kingdom: Plantae
- Clade: Tracheophytes
- Clade: Angiosperms
- Clade: Eudicots
- Clade: Rosids
- Order: Fabales
- Family: Fabaceae
- Subfamily: Faboideae
- Genus: Jacksonia
- Species: J. calcicola

Binomial name
- Jacksonia calcicola Chappill

Synonyms
- Jacksonia sericea var. robusta Benth.; Jacksonia sp. (R.Pullen 9659); Jacksonia stricta auct. non Meisn.: Wheeler, J.R. & Crisp, M.D. in Marchant, N.G.

= Jacksonia calcicola =

Species of legume

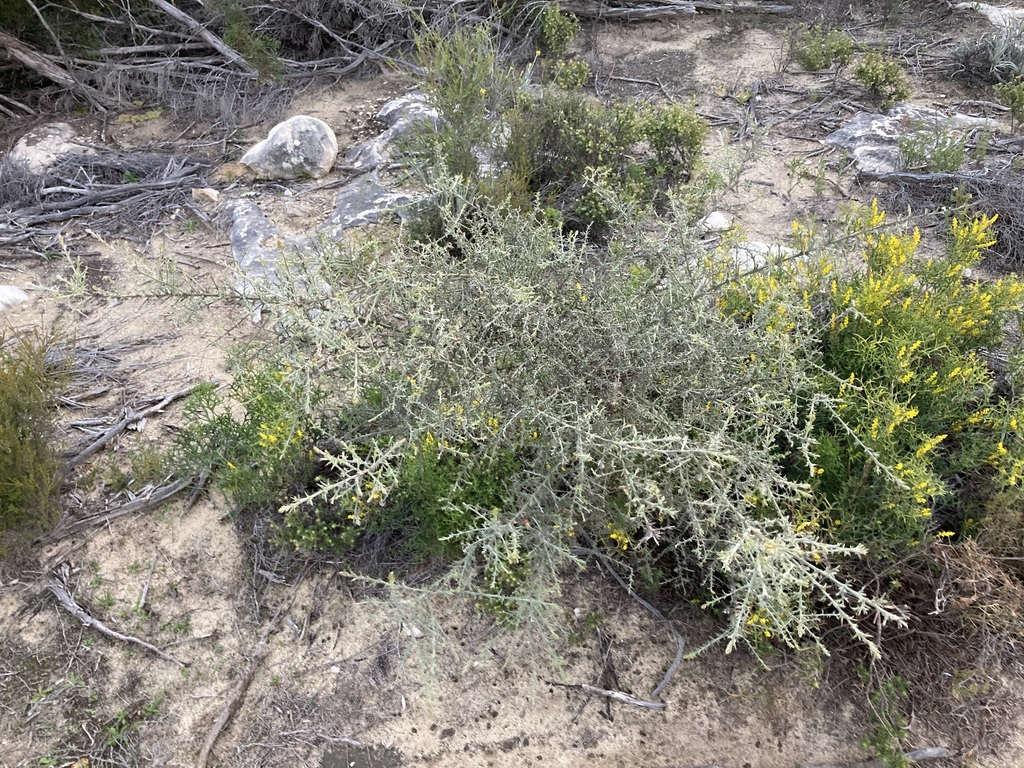
Habit near Arrowsmith

Jacksonia calcicola is a species of flowering plant in the family Fabaceae and is endemic to the south west of Western Australia. It is a prostrate spreading or erect, prickly shrub with short, curved backwards and sharply pointed end branches, yellow-orange flowers with red markings, and woody, hairy pods.

== Description ==
Jacksonia calcicola is a prostrate spreading or erect shrub that typically grows up to 0.2–1.5 m (7.9 in – 4 ft 11.1 in) high and 1–2 m (3 ft 3 in – 6 ft 7 in) wide, its branches greyish-green. Its end branches are 2–13 mm (0.079–0.512 in) long and 1.0–1.5 mm (0.039–0.059 in) wide, flattened, curved backwards and sharply-pointed. The leaves are reduced to pale brown, triangular scales, 0.6–2 mm (0.024–0.079 in) long and 0.8–1.8 mm (0.031–0.071 in) wide. The flowers are scattered along branches on a pedicel 3.0–4.5 mm (0.12–0.18 in) long. There are lance-shaped bracteoles 0.75–1.5 mm (0.030–0.059 in) long and 0.6–1 mm (0.024–0.039 in) wide on the pedicels. The floral tube is 1.2–1.4 mm (0.047–0.055 in) long and the sepals are membranous, the lobes 7.0–7.2 mm (0.28–0.28 in) long, 1.1–2.1 mm (0.043–0.083 in) wide and fused at the base. The standard petal is yellow-orange to orange with red markings, 5.9–6.0 mm (0.23–0.24 in) long, the wings yellow-orange with red marking, 6.2–7.1 mm (0.24–0.28 in) long, and the keel orange to red, 5.7–6.0 mm (0.22–0.24 in) long. The stamens have pink filaments 3.9–6.8 mm (0.15–0.27 in) long. Flowering occurs throughout the year, and the fruit is a woody, densely hairy, broadly elliptic pod, 5.5–6.2 mm (0.22–0.24 in) long and 3.6–4.2 mm (0.14–0.17 in) wide.

== Taxonomy ==
Jacksonia calcicola was first formally described in 2007 by Jennifer Anne Chappill in Australian Systematic Botany from specimens collected 10 km (6.2 mi) east of Cervantes by Greg Keighery in 1982. The specific epithet (calcicola) means 'limestone dweller', referring to the habitat.

== Distribution and habitat ==
This species of Jacksonia grows in coastal shrubland on limestone between Eurardy Station and the coastal suburbs of Perth in the Geraldton Sandplains and Swan Coastal Plain bioregions of Western Australia.

== Conservation status ==
Jacksonia calcicola is listed as "not threatened" by the Government of Western Australia, Department of Biodiversity, Conservation and Attractions.
