= Jacksonia ramulosa =

Scientific classification
- Kingdom: Plantae
- Clade: Tracheophytes
- Clade: Angiosperms
- Clade: Eudicots
- Clade: Rosids
- Order: Fabales
- Family: Fabaceae
- Subfamily: Faboideae
- Genus: Jacksonia
- Species: J. ramulosa

Binomial name
- Jacksonia ramulosa Chappill

Species of legume

Jacksonia ramulosa is a species of flowering plant in the family Fabaceae and is endemic to the south-west of Western Australia. It is an erect, tangled shrub with greyish-green branches, scattered, sharply-pointed end branchlets, leaves reduced to dark brown, triangular scales, orange-red flowers with red markings, and woody, densely hairy, broadly elliptic pods.

== Description ==
Jacksonia ramulosa is an erect, open to compact, tangled shrub that typically grows up to 0.3–1 m (1 ft 0 in – 3 ft 3 in) high and 1.0–1.2 m (3 ft 3 in – 3 ft 11 in) wide. It has greyish-green branches, scattered, sharply-pointed branchlets mostly 1.5–14 mm (0.059–0.551 in) long and 0.5–1.5 mm (0.020–0.059 in) wide, its leaves reduced to triangular, dark brown scales, 0.7–1.3 mm (0.028–0.051 in) long, 0.6–1.3 mm (0.024–0.051 in) wide and sometimes with toothed edges. The flowers are scattered on the branchlets on a pedicel 1.8–4.3 mm (0.071–0.169 in) long, with egg-shaped bracteoles 0.7–1.2 mm (0.028–0.047 in) long and 0.45–0.80 mm (0.018–0.031 in) wide on the upper part of the pedicel. The floral tube is 0.9–1 mm (0.035–0.039 in) long and not ribbed, and the sepals are membranous, with lobes 6.1–7.9 mm (0.24–0.31 in) long, 0.9–1.2 mm (0.035–0.047 in) wide and fused for 0.5–0.6 mm (0.020–0.024 in). The standard petal is orange-red with red markings, 4.7–6.7 mm (0.19–0.26 in) long and 5.0–6.5 mm (0.20–0.26 in) deep, the wings orange-red with red markings 4.6–7.0 mm (0.18–0.28 in) long, and the keel is red, 5.0–6.4 mm (0.20–0.25 in) long. The stamens have green filaments, 4.0–7.5 mm (0.16–0.30 in) long. Flowering occurs from September to January, and the fruit is a broadly elliptic, woody, densely hairy pod 4.5–6.0 mm (0.18–0.24 in) long and 3–4 mm (0.12–0.16 in) wide.

== Taxonomy ==
Jacksonia ramulosa was first formally described in 2007 by Jennifer Anne Chappill in Australian Systematic Botany from specimens collected by Gregory John Keighery in 2003. The specific epithet (ramulosa) means 'bearing branchlets'.

== Distribution and habitat ==
This species of Jacksonia grows in shrubland and woodland on sandy soil or clay in scattered locations between Kalbarri and Mount Esmond in Cape Arid National Park, in the Avon Wheatbelt, Coolgardie, Geraldton Sandplains, Jarrah Forest and Mallee bioregions of south-western Western Australia.

== Conservation status ==
Jacksonia ramulosa is listed as "not threatened" by the Government of Western Australia Department of Biodiversity, Conservation and Attractions.
