= Jacksonia dendrospinosa =

Conservation status
- Priority Four — Rare Taxa (DEC)

Scientific classification
- Kingdom: Plantae
- Clade: Tracheophytes
- Clade: Angiosperms
- Clade: Eudicots
- Clade: Rosids
- Order: Fabales
- Family: Fabaceae
- Subfamily: Faboideae
- Genus: Jacksonia
- Species: J. dendrospinosa

Binomial name
- Jacksonia dendrospinosa Chappill

Species of legume

Jacksonia dendrospinosa is a species of flowering plant in the family Fabaceae and is endemic to the far west of Western Australia. It is a dense, erect shrub or tree with straight, sharply-pointed branches, leaves reduced to scales, scattered yellow-orange flowers with red markings, and membranous, hairy pods.

== Description ==
Jacksonia dendrospinosa is a dense, erect shrub or tree that typically grows up to 1.5–3.3 m (4 ft 11 in – 10 ft 10 in) high and 1–4 m (3 ft 3 in – 13 ft 1 in) wide, its branches greyish-green. Its end branches are straight, circular in cross section, 6–53 mm (0.24–2.09 in) long and 1.5–1.8 mm (0.059–0.071 in) wide and scattered along the main branches. The leaves are reduced to dark brown triangular scales, 0.3–0.7 mm (0.012–0.028 in) long and 0.35–1.0 mm (0.014–0.039 in) wide. The flowers are scattered along branches, each flower on a pedicel 3.1–3.5 mm (0.12–0.14 in) long. There are triangular bracteoles 0.4–0.7 mm (0.016–0.028 in) long and 0.3–0.5 mm (0.012–0.020 in) wide on the pedicels. The floral tube is 1.2–1.5 mm (0.047–0.059 in) long and the sepals are membranous, the lobes 6.8–8 mm (0.27–0.31 in) long, 0.9–1.8 mm (0.035–0.071 in) wide. The flowers are yellow-orange with red markings, the standard petal is 4.7–5.2 mm (0.19–0.20 in) long and 3.5–4.3 mm (0.14–0.17 in) deep, the wings 5.9–6.0 mm (0.23–0.24 in) long, and the keel 5.2–5.7 mm (0.20–0.22 in) long. The stamens have green filaments 5.3–7.5 mm (0.21–0.30 in) long. Flowering occurs from September to December, and the fruit is a membranous, hairy, flattened, elliptic pod, 4.3–5.0 mm (0.17–0.20 in) long and 2.2–2.5 mm (0.087–0.098 in) wide.

== Taxonomy ==
Jacksonia dendrospinosa was first formally described in 2007 by Jennifer Anne Chappill in Australian Systematic Botany from specimens collected near the north-east boundary of Nerren Nerren Station. The specific epithet (dendrospinosa) means 'spiny tree', and refers to the habit of this species, which differs from the otherwise similar J. spinosa.

== Distribution and habitat ==
This species of Jacksonia grows in tall shrubland or woodland between Ajana and Tamala in the Carnarvon and Yalgoo bioregions of western Western Australia.

== Conservation status ==
Jacksonia dendrospinosa is listed as "Priority Four" by the Government of Western Australia Department of Biodiversity, Conservation and Attractions, meaning that is rare or near threatened.
