= Jacksonia rhadinoclada =

Scientific classification
- Kingdom: Plantae
- Clade: Tracheophytes
- Clade: Angiosperms
- Clade: Eudicots
- Clade: Rosids
- Order: Fabales
- Family: Fabaceae
- Subfamily: Faboideae
- Genus: Jacksonia
- Species: J. rhadinoclada

Binomial name
- Jacksonia rhadinoclada F.Muell.

Synonyms
- Piptomeris rhadinoclada (F.Muell.) Greene

Species of legume

Jacksonia rhadinoclada is a species of flowering plant in the family Fabaceae and is endemic to inland areas of Western Australia. It is a spreading to prostrate, delicate shrub with many dull green branches, the end branches sharply-pointed phylloclades, the leaves reduced to black, egg-shaped scales, yellow-orange and red flowers, and woody, densely hairy, elliptic pods.

== Description ==
Jacksonia rhadinoclada is a spreading to prostrate, delicate shrub that typically grows up to 0.15–1.6 m (5.9 in – 5 ft 3.0 in) high and 0.2–1 m (7.9 in – 3 ft 3.4 in) wide. It has many dull green branches, the end branches sharply-pointed phylloclades, its leaves reduced to egg-shaped, black scales, 1.0–1.8 mm (0.039–0.071 in) long and 0.6–1.2 mm (0.024–0.047 in) wide with toothed edges. The flowers are densely arranged along the branches on pedicels 0.7–1.6 mm (0.028–0.063 in) long, with egg-shaped bracteoles 1.0–1.7 mm (0.039–0.067 in) long and 0.8–1 mm (0.031–0.039 in) wide at the base of the floral tube. The floral tube is 0.6–0.8 mm (0.024–0.031 in) long and not ribbed, and the sepals are membranous, with lobes 5.1–7 mm (0.20–0.28 in) long, 1.5–2.4 mm (0.059–0.094 in) wide and fused for 0.4–0.7 mm (0.016–0.028 in). The standard petal is yellow-orange with red markings, 4.7–6.2 mm (0.19–0.24 in) long and 5.5–7.6 mm (0.22–0.30 in) deep, the wings yellow-orange with red markings 3.9–5.2 mm (0.15–0.20 in) long, and the keel is red, 4.8–5.4 mm (0.19–0.21 in) long. The stamens have orange-red filaments, 2.5–5.3 mm (0.098–0.209 in) long. Flowering occurs from June to November, and the fruit is an elliptic, woody, densely hairy pod 3.3–3.6 mm (0.13–0.14 in) long and 2.7–3.0 mm (0.11–0.12 in) wide.

== Taxonomy ==
Jacksonia rhadinoclada was first formally described in 1876 by Ferdinand von Mueller in his Fragmenta Phytographiae Australiae. The specific epithet (rhadinoclada) means 'slender shoot or branch'.

== Distribution and habitat ==
This species of Jacksonia grows on sand or brown clay-loam in shrubland or woodland in inland areas of Western Australia between Pindar and Bencubbin in the Avon Wheatbelt, Coolgardie, Geraldton Sandplains and Yalgoo bioregions of Western Australia.

== Conservation status ==
Jacksonia rhadinoclada is listed as "not threatened" by the Government of Western Australia Department of Biodiversity, Conservation and Attractions.
