= Jacksonia calycina =

Conservation status
- Priority Four — Rare Taxa (DEC)

Scientific classification
- Kingdom: Plantae
- Clade: Tracheophytes
- Clade: Angiosperms
- Clade: Eudicots
- Clade: Rosids
- Order: Fabales
- Family: Fabaceae
- Subfamily: Faboideae
- Genus: Jacksonia
- Species: J. calycina

Binomial name
- Jacksonia calycina Domin

Species of legume

Jacksonia calycina is a species of flowering plant in the family Fabaceae and is endemic to the south west of Western Australia. It is an erect or straggling shrub with sharply pointed end branches, yellow-orange flowers with red and yellow markings, and woody, hairy pods.

== Description ==
Jacksonia calycina is an erect or straggling shrub that typically grows up to 0.2–1.5 m (7.9 in – 4 ft 11.1 in) high and 0.5–1 m (1 ft 8 in – 3 ft 3 in) wide, its branches dull green. Its leaves are reduced to egg-shaped scales with toothed edges, 0.8–2 mm (0.031–0.079 in) long and 1.2–1.4 mm (0.047–0.055 in) wide. The flowers are scattered along branches on a pedicel 1.5–4 mm (0.059–0.157 in) long. There are toothed, egg-shaped bracteoles 1.0–2.7 mm (0.039–0.106 in) long and 0.6–1.3 mm (0.024–0.051 in) wide on the pedicels. The floral tube is 1.3–1.5 mm (0.051–0.059 in) long and the sepals are membranous, the lobes 8–10 mm (0.31–0.39 in) long, 1.3–1.5 mm (0.051–0.059 in) wide and fused at the base for 0.7–0.9 mm (0.028–0.035 in). The standard petal is orange with red markings and a yellow base, 8.0–9.1 mm (0.31–0.36 in) long and 9.7–12.8 mm (0.38–0.50 in) wide, the wings orange with a red base, 9.5–9.6 mm (0.37–0.38 in) long, and the keel deep red, 6.8–8.5 mm (0.27–0.33 in) long. The stamens filaments are white with a pink tip, 7.1–11 mm (0.28–0.43 in) long. Flowering occurs from July to November, and the fruit is a woody, elliptic pod, 8.7–9 mm (0.34–0.35 in) long and 3.2–3.6 mm (0.13–0.14 in) wide.

== Taxonomy ==
Jacksonia calycina was first formally described in 1923 by Karel Domin in Vestnik Kralovske Ceske Spolecnosti Nauk, Trida Matematiko-Prirodevedecke from specimens collected by Arthur Dorrien-Smith. The specific epithet (calycina) means 'belonging to the calyx', used when the sepals are unusual.

== Distribution and habitat ==
This species of Jacksonia grows in dense shrubland in the Stirling Range and Mount Manypeaks in the Avon Wheatbelt, Esperance Plains and Jarrah Forest bioregions in the south-west of Western Australia.

== Conservation status ==
Jacksonia calycina is listed as "Priority Four" by the Government of Western Australia Department of Biodiversity, Conservation and Attractions, meaning that is rare or near threatened.
