= Jacksonia foliosa =

Scientific classification
- Kingdom: Plantae
- Clade: Tracheophytes
- Clade: Angiosperms
- Clade: Eudicots
- Clade: Rosids
- Order: Fabales
- Family: Fabaceae
- Subfamily: Faboideae
- Genus: Jacksonia
- Species: J. foliosa

Binomial name
- Jacksonia foliosa Turcz.

Synonyms
- Piptomeris foliosa (Turcz.) Greene

Species of legume

Jacksonia foliosa is a species of flowering plant in the family Fabaceae and is endemic to the south west of Western Australia. It is a low-lying or erect shrub with sharply pointed end branches, yellow-orange flowers with red markings, and woody, hairy pods.

== Description ==
Jacksonia foliosa is a low-lying or erect shrub that typically grows up to 0.2–1 m (7.9 in – 3 ft 3.4 in) high and 0.25–0.3 m (9.8 in – 11.8 in) wide, its branches greyish green and prominently ribbed. Its end branches are sharply-pointed and not branched, 8–73 mm (0.31–2.87 in) long and 1.5–2.0 mm (0.059–0.079 in) wide, its leaves reduced to egg-shaped, dark brown scales, 1.3–3.7 mm (0.051–0.146 in) long and 0.7–1.6 mm (0.028–0.063 in) wide. The flowers are scattered near the tips of the long, upright branches on a straight pedicel 3.1–6.2 mm (0.12–0.24 in) long. There are narrowly egg-shaped bracteoles 0.7–1.3 mm (0.028–0.051 in) long and 0.35–0.6 mm (0.014–0.024 in) wide on the pedicels. The floral tube is 0.6–1 mm (0.024–0.039 in) long and the sepals are membranous, the lobes 5.5–9.6 mm (0.22–0.38 in) long, 0.8–1.6 mm (0.031–0.063 in) wide and fused at the base for 0.20–0.25 mm (0.0079–0.0098 in). The standard petal is yellow-orange with red markings, 4.8–5.2 mm (0.19–0.20 in) long and 5.0–7.3 mm (0.20–0.29 in) wide, the wings orange-red with red markings, 4.7–5 mm (0.19–0.20 in) long, and the keel is red, 5.0–5.5 mm (0.20–0.22 in) long. The filaments of the stamens are pink, 4–7 mm (0.16–0.28 in) long. Flowering occurs from May to December, and the fruit is a woody, hairy, elliptic pod, 5.5–8 mm (0.22–0.31 in) long and 3.2–3.8 mm (0.13–0.15 in) wide.

== Taxonomy ==
Jacksonia foliosa was first formally described in 1853 by Nikolai Turczaninow in the Bulletin de la Société Impériale des Naturalistes de Moscou from specimens collected by James Drummond. The specific epithet (foliosa) means 'leafy' or 'full of leaves'.

== Distribution and habitat ==
This species of Jacksonia grows in shrubland in sand over laterite between Mount Adams and Wongan Hills in the Avon Wheatbelt, Geraldton Sandplains, Jarrah Forest and Swan Coastal Plain bioregions of south-west of Western Australia.

== Conservation status ==
Jacksonia foliosa is listed as "not threatened" by the Government of Western Australia Department of Biodiversity, Conservation and Attractions.
