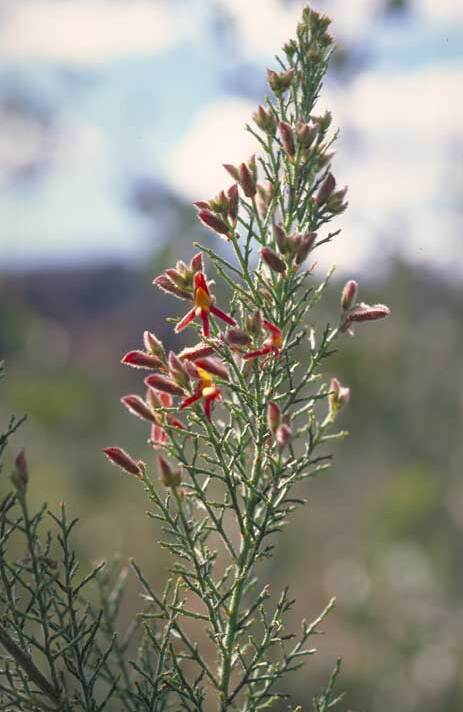
- In the Bungle Bungle Range

Scientific classification
- Kingdom: Plantae
- Clade: Tracheophytes
- Clade: Angiosperms
- Clade: Eudicots
- Clade: Rosids
- Order: Fabales
- Family: Fabaceae
- Subfamily: Faboideae
- Genus: Jacksonia
- Species: J. odontoclada

Binomial name
- Jacksonia odontoclada F.Muell. ex Benth.

Synonyms
- Piptomeris odontoclada (Benth.) Greene

= Jacksonia odontoclada =

Species of legume

Jacksonia odontoclada is a species of flowering plant in the family Fabaceae and is endemic to northern Australia. It is a soft, erect shrub with many branches, the end branches straight or sinuous, yellow-orange flowers, and woody, densely hairy pods.

== Description ==
Jacksonia odontoclada is a soft, erect shrub that typically grows up to 0.2–2.5 m (7.9 in – 8 ft 2.4 in) high and 0.5–2 m (1 ft 8 in – 6 ft 7 in) wide, with many greyish green and ribbed branches. Its end branches are straight or sinuous, 7.2–19 mm (0.28–0.75 in) long and 0.4–0.5 mm (0.016–0.020 in) in diameter. Its leaves reduced to narrowly egg-shaped, green or brown scales, 1.0–2.4 mm (0.039–0.094 in) long and 0.4–0.5 mm (0.016–0.020 in) wide. The flowers are densely arranged near the ends of branches, each flower on a straight pedicel 1.3–2.1 mm (0.051–0.083 in) long. There are egg-shaped bracteoles 2.1–3.0 mm (0.083–0.118 in) long and 0.7–1.0 mm (0.028–0.039 in) wide on the pedicels. The floral tube is 1.2–2.0 mm (0.047–0.079 in) long and ribbed, the sepals membranous, the upper lobes 2.5–2.8 mm (0.098–0.110 in) long and 1.3 mm (0.051 in) wide, the lower lobes 6.1–6.9 mm (0.24–0.27 in) long and 1.0–1.3 mm (0.039–0.051 in) wide. The petals are yellow-orange without markings, the standard petal 4.2–4.5 mm (0.17–0.18 in) long and 3.8–4.0 mm (0.15–0.16 in) wide, the wings 5.4–5.6 mm (0.21–0.22 in) long, and the keel 5.6–5.8 mm (0.22–0.23 in) long. The filaments of the stamens are red, 4.3–6.7 mm (0.17–0.26 in) long. Flowering occurs from May to September, and the fruit is a woody, densely hairy, elliptic pod, 4.2–6.8 mm (0.17–0.27 in) long and 2.1–2.6 mm (0.083–0.102 in) wide.

== Taxonomy ==
Jacksonia odontoclada was first formally described in 1864 by George Bentham in his Flora Australiensis from an unpublished description by Ferdinand von Mueller from specimens collected near Mount Churchman by Jess Young. The specific epithet (odontoclada) means 'a toothed branch or shoot'.

== Distribution and habitat ==
This species of Jacksonia grows in red sand on sandstone plateaus from the Bungle Bungle Range in Western Australia through the central Northern Territory to northern inland Queensland.

== Conservation status ==
Jacksonia odontoclada is listed as "not threatened" by the Government of Western Australia Department of Biodiversity, Conservation and Attractions.
