= Jacksonia vernicosa =

Scientific classification
- Kingdom: Plantae
- Clade: Tracheophytes
- Clade: Angiosperms
- Clade: Eudicots
- Clade: Rosids
- Order: Fabales
- Family: Fabaceae
- Subfamily: Faboideae
- Genus: Jacksonia
- Species: J. vernicosa

Binomial name
- Jacksonia vernicosa F.Muell. ex Benth.

Synonyms
- Piptomeris vernicosa (F.Muell. ex Benth.) Greene

Species of legume

Jacksonia vernicosa is a species of flowering plant in the family Fabaceae and is endemic to north-eastern Australia. It is an erect, spindly shrub with yellowish green branches, the end branches sharply-pointed cladodes, leaves reduced to dark brown, narrowly egg-shaped to egg-shaped scales with sharply-pointed tips, orange flowers sparsely arranged along the branches, and woody, densely hairy, elliptic pods.

== Description ==
Jacksonia vernicosa is an erect, spindly shrub that typically grows up to 1–2.5 m (3 ft 3 in – 8 ft 2 in) high and 0.5–2.5 m (1 ft 8 in – 8 ft 2 in) wide. It has yellowish green branches, the end branches sharply-pointed cladodes, its leaves reduced to narrowly egg-shaped to egg-shaped, dark brown scales, 0.6–2 mm (0.024–0.079 in) long and 0.5–1 mm (0.020–0.039 in) wide with a sharply-pointed tip. The flowers are sparsely arranged along the branches on pedicels 1.3–2.3 mm (0.051–0.091 in) long, with narrowly egg-shaped bracteoles 0.9–1.7 mm (0.035–0.067 in) long and 0.6–1 mm (0.024–0.039 in) wide below the sepals. The floral tube is 1.1–1.9 mm (0.043–0.075 in) long and is ribbed, and the sepals are membranous, reddish brown on the inner surface, with upper lobes 2.6–4.2 mm (0.10–0.17 in) long, 1.3–1.9 mm (0.051–0.075 in) wide and fused for 0.6–0.8 mm (0.024–0.031 in). The flowers are orange, the standard petal 5.4–5.6 mm (0.21–0.22 in) long and 4.0–5.7 mm (0.16–0.22 in) deep, the wings 5.9–6.2 mm (0.23–0.24 in) long, and the keel 5.9–6.1 mm (0.23–0.24 in) long. The stamens have red filaments, 4.5–7 mm (0.18–0.28 in) long. Flowering occurs from Mzy to September, and the fruit is a woody, elliptic, densely hairy pod 5.0–5.7 mm (0.20–0.22 in) long and 3.0–3.3 mm (0.12–0.13 in) wide.

== Taxonomy ==
Jacksonia vernicosa was first formally described in 1864 by George Bentham in his Flora Australiensis from an unpublished description by Ferdinand von Mueller, from specimens Mueller collected in the Gulf of Carpentaria. The specific epithet (vernicosa) means 'varnished'.

== Distribution and habitat ==
This species of Jacksonia grows in woodland in sandy soil, often close to watercourses in north-eastern Northern Territory near McArthur River and Alexandria Station, and in northern Queensland.

== Conservation status ==
Jacksonia vernicosa is listed as of "least concern" under the Queensland Government Nature Conservation Act 1992 and the Northern Territory Territory Parks and Wildlife Conservation Act.
