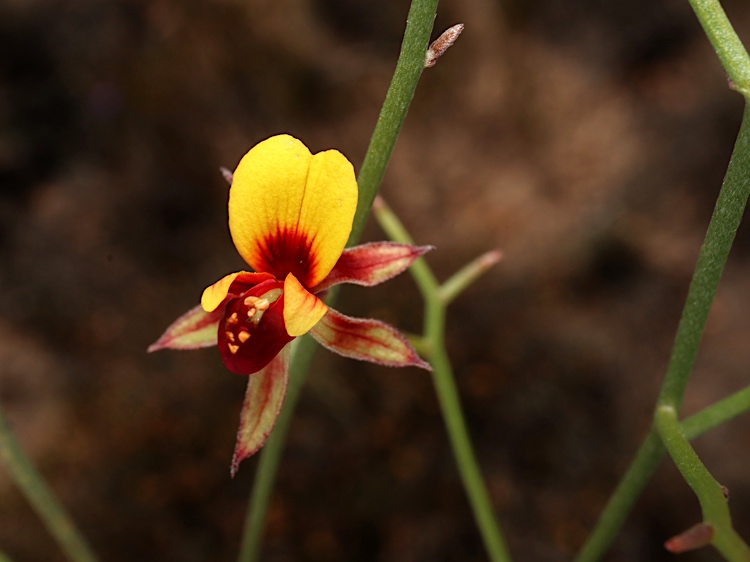
- In Heathland Nature Reserve

Scientific classification
- Kingdom: Plantae
- Clade: Tracheophytes
- Clade: Angiosperms
- Clade: Eudicots
- Clade: Rosids
- Order: Fabales
- Family: Fabaceae
- Subfamily: Faboideae
- Genus: Jacksonia
- Species: J. racemosa

Binomial name
- Jacksonia racemosa Meisn.

Synonyms
- Jacksonia aphylla (Turcz.) Druce; Jacksonia aphylla (Turcz.) Domin isonym; Jacksonia piptomeris Benth. nom. illeg., nom. superfl.; Jacksonia racemosa var. pubiflora Benth.; Jacksonia racemosa Meisn. var. racemosa; Piptomeris aphylla Turcz.; Piptomeris racemosa (Meisn.) Greene

= Jacksonia racemosa =

Species of legume

Jacksonia racemosa is a species of flowering plant in the family Fabaceae and is endemic to the south-west of Western Australia. It is an erect to prostrate, spindly shrub with greyish-green branches, with leaves reduced to scales leaves, yellow flowers with red markings and scattered along the branches, and woody, hairy pods.

== Description ==
Jacksonia racemosa is an erect to prostrate, spindly shrub that typically grows to 0.1–0.6 m (3.9 in – 1 ft 11.6 in) high and 0.2–1.5 m (7.9 in – 4 ft 11.1 in) wide, its branches greyish-geen, with sharply-pointed branchlets 5–9.3 mm (0.20–0.37 in) long and 0.3–0.4 mm (0.012–0.016 in) long at the base of the plant. Its leaves are reduced to dark-brown, narrowly egg-shaped scales, 0.4–1.3 mm (0.016–0.051 in) long, 0.25–1.0 mm (0.0098–0.0394 in) wide and sometimes have toothed edges. The flowers are scattered along the branches on pedicels 1.5–5.4 mm (0.059–0.213 in) long, with narrowly egg-shaped bracteoles 0.6–1.2 mm (0.024–0.047 in) long and 0.3–0.4 mm (0.012–0.016 in) side on the middle of the pedicels. The floral tube is 0.3–1.4 mm (0.012–0.055 in) long and the sepals are membranous, with lobes 5.0–7.7 mm (0.20–0.30 in) long and 1.1–1.6 mm (0.043–0.063 in) wide. The standard petal is yellow with red markings, 5.3–6.7 mm (0.21–0.26 in) long and 5.0–7.4 mm (0.20–0.29 in) broad, the wings yellow with red markings, 4.8–5.4 mm (0.19–0.21 in) long, and the keel is dark red, 5.0–6.3 mm (0.20–0.25 in) long. The stamens have white, pink or red, filaments 0.4–0.6 mm (0.016–0.024 in) long. Flowering occurs from July to February, and the fruit is a woody, narrowly elliptical pod 4.3–4.7 mm (0.17–0.19 in) long, 1.5–3.1 mm (0.059–0.122 in) wide and glabrous or with white hairs pressed against the surface.

== Taxonomy ==
Jacksonia racemosa was first formally described in 1848 by Carl Meissner in Lehmann's Plantae Preissianae from specimens collected by James Drummond in the Swan River Colony. The specific epithet (racemosa) means 'racemose'.

== Distribution and habitat ==
This species of Jacksonia grows on lateritic ridges or flats in heathland or woodland from east of Perth to the Stirling Ranges and east of Munglinup to Esperance in the Avon Wheatbelt, Esperance Plains, Jarrah Forest and Mallee bioregions of south-western Western Australia.

== Conservation status ==
Jacksonia racemosa is listed as "not threatened" by the Government of Western Australia Department of Biodiversity, Conservation and Attractions.
