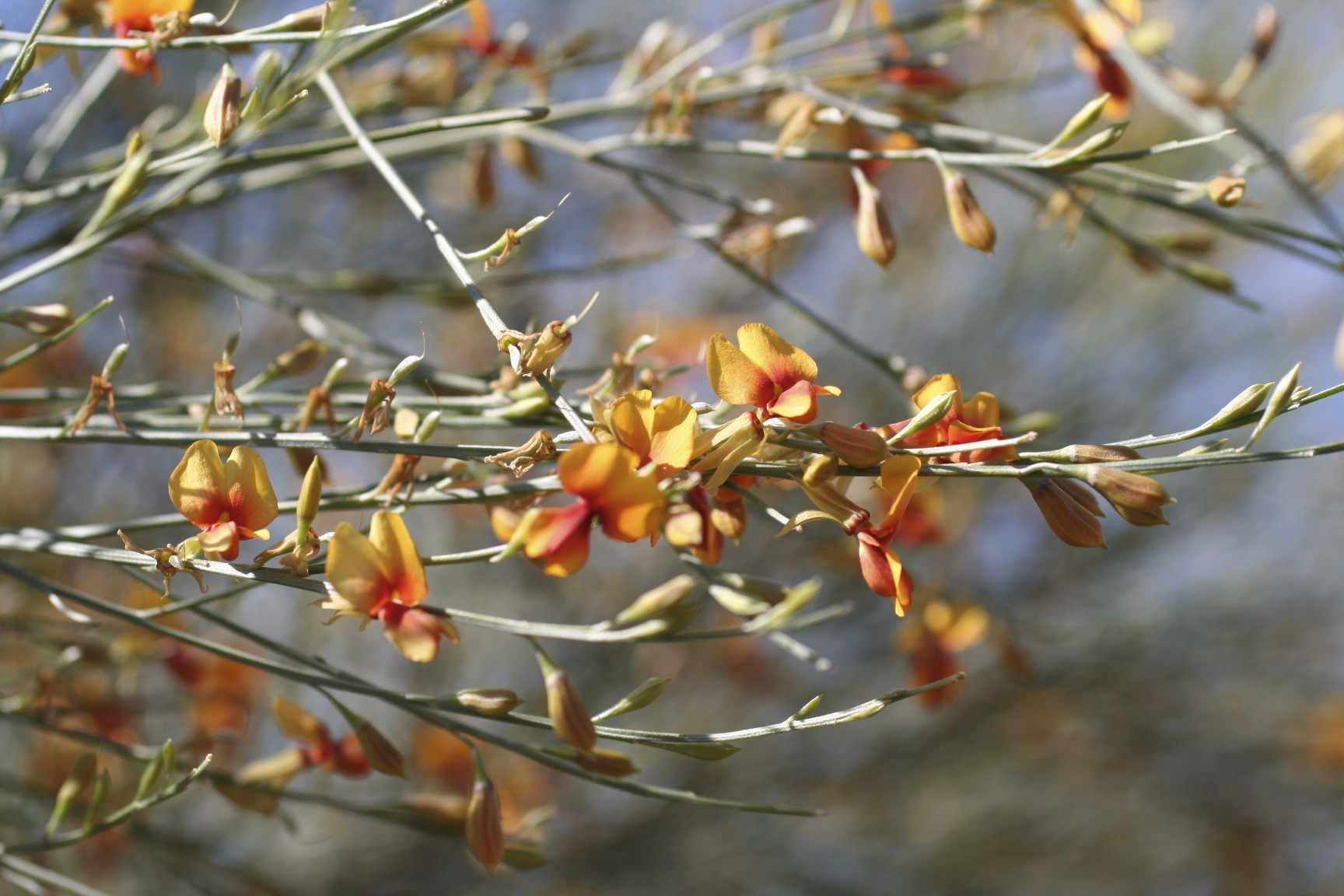

Scientific classification
- Kingdom: Plantae
- Clade: Tracheophytes
- Clade: Angiosperms
- Clade: Eudicots
- Clade: Rosids
- Order: Fabales
- Family: Fabaceae
- Subfamily: Faboideae
- Genus: Jacksonia
- Species: J. angulata

Binomial name
- Jacksonia angulata Benth.

Synonyms
- Jacksonia lehmanni var. angulata Blackall & Grieve nom. inval., nom. nud.; Jacksonia pteroclada F.Muell.; Piptomeris angulata (Benth.) Greene; Piptomeris pteroclada (F.Muell.) Greene

= Jacksonia angulata =

Species of legume

Jacksonia angulata is a species of flowering plant in the family Fabaceae and is endemic to the south-west of Western Australia. It is a tufted, spreading to prostrate shrub often with zig-zagged branches, sharply-pointed side branches or phylloclades, leaves reduced to broadly egg-shaped scales, yellow-orange to orange flowers with a red "eye", and woody, densely hairy pods.

== Description ==
Jacksonia angulata is a tufted, spreading to prostrate shrub that typically grows up to 10–60 cm (3.9–23.6 in) high and 0.5–1.5 m (1 ft 8 in – 4 ft 11 in) wide. It has angular to winged branches, the side branches sharply-pointed phylloclades 0.9–1.5 mm (0.035–0.059 in) wide. Its leaves are reduced to broadly egg-shaped, light to dark brown scales, 1.3–2.8 mm (0.051–0.110 in) long and 1–2 mm (0.039–0.079 in) wide. The flowers are scattered along the branches on a pedicel 2.4–3.9 mm (0.094–0.154 in) long, with narrowly egg-shaped bracteoles 1.3–2.5 mm (0.051–0.098 in) long and 0.8–1.2 mm (0.031–0.047 in) wide near the top of the pedicels. The floral tube is 1.3–2.5 mm (0.051–0.098 in) long and the sepals are papery, with lobes 9.6–12.7 mm (0.38–0.50 in) long and 1.4–3 mm (0.055–0.118 in) wide. The standard petal is yellow-orange to orange with a red "eye" and veins, 7.0–8.5 mm (0.28–0.33 in) long, the wings yellow-orange to orange with orange-red markings, 7.8–8.5 mm (0.31–0.33 in) long, and the keel is deep red, 7.1–7.6 mm (0.28–0.30 in) long. The stamens have whitish-green filaments with a pink tip and are 4.1–6.5 mm (0.16–0.26 in) long. Flowering occurs from August to December, and the fruit is a woody, densely hairy pod 5.0–6.5 mm (0.20–0.26 in) long and 2.8–3.0 mm (0.11–0.12 in) wide.

== Taxonomy ==
Jacksonia angulata was first formally described in 1864 by George Bentham in his Flora Australiensis from specimens collected by James Drummond. The specific epithet (angulata) means 'angled', referring to the branchlets.

== Distribution and habitat ==
This species of Jacksonia grows in shrubland or woodland in winter-wet areas between Kalbarri and the Darkin Swamp east of Perth, in the Avon Wheatbelt, Geraldton Sandplains, Jarrah Forest and Swan Coastal Plain bioregions of south-western Western Australia.

== Conservation status ==
This species is listed as "not threatened" by the Government of Western Australia Department of Biodiversity, Conservation and Attractions.
