= Jacksonia nematoclada =

Scientific classification
- Kingdom: Plantae
- Clade: Tracheophytes
- Clade: Angiosperms
- Clade: Eudicots
- Clade: Rosids
- Order: Fabales
- Family: Fabaceae
- Subfamily: Faboideae
- Genus: Jacksonia
- Species: J. nematoclada

Binomial name
- Jacksonia nematoclada F.Muell.

Synonyms
- Jacksonia hemisericea D.A.Herb.; Piptomeris nematoclada (F.Muell.) Greene

Species of legume

Jacksonia nematoclada is a species of flowering plant in the family Fabaceae and is endemic to inland Western Australia. It is a low, spreading shrub with sharply pointed phylloclades, yellow-orange flowers with red markings, and woody, densely hairy pods.

== Description ==
Jacksonia nematoclada is a low, spreading, densely tufted shrub that typically grows up to 15–30 cm (5.9–11.8 in) high and 12–60 m (39–197 ft) wide, its branches greyish green and ribbed. Its end branches are sharply-pointed phylloclades, its leaves reduced to egg-shaped, dark brown scales, 0.8–1.8 mm (0.031–0.071 in) long and 0.4–1 mm (0.016–0.039 in) wide. The flowers are scattered near the ends of branches on a straight pedicel 2.8–3.9 mm (0.11–0.15 in) long. There are egg-shaped bracteoles 1.0–1.5 mm (0.039–0.059 in) long and 0.4–0.5 mm (0.016–0.020 in) wide on the pedicels. The floral tube is 0.8–1.5 mm (0.031–0.059 in) long and the sepals are membranous, the lobes 5.3–7.1 mm (0.21–0.28 in) long and 1.1–1.6 mm (0.043–0.063 in) wide. The standard petal is yellow-orange with red markings, 4.3–5.7 mm (0.17–0.22 in) long and 8.9–9.4 mm (0.35–0.37 in) wide, the wings yellow-orange with red markings, 5.0–5.8 mm (0.20–0.23 in) long, and the keel is red, 3.8–5 mm (0.15–0.20 in) long. The filaments of the stamens are green with a red tip, 2.7–5.6 mm (0.11–0.22 in) long. Flowering occurs from August to November, and the fruit is a woody, densely hairy, more or less spherical pod, 4.2–4.5 mm (0.17–0.18 in) long and 3.6–4.5 mm (0.14–0.18 in) wide.

== Taxonomy ==
Jacksonia nematoclada was first formally described in 1876 by Ferdinand von Mueller in his Fragmenta Phytographiae Australiae from specimens collected near Mount Churchman by Jess Young. The specific epithet (nematoclada) means 'thread-like branch'.

== Distribution and habitat ==
This species of Jacksonia grows in sandy or clayey soils on low rises and plains and is widespread in the Avon Wheatbelt, Coolgardie, Great Victoria Desert, Mallee and Murchison bioregions of inland Western Australia.

== Conservation status ==
Jacksonia nematoclada is listed as "not threatened" by the Government of Western Australia Department of Biodiversity, Conservation and Attractions.
