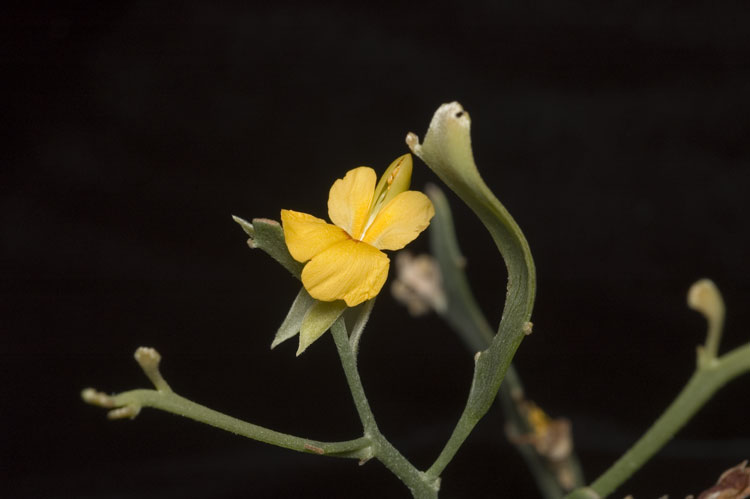
- In the Australian National Botanic Gardens

Scientific classification
- Kingdom: Plantae
- Clade: Tracheophytes
- Clade: Angiosperms
- Clade: Eudicots
- Clade: Rosids
- Order: Fabales
- Family: Fabaceae
- Subfamily: Faboideae
- Genus: Jacksonia
- Species: J. grevilleoides

Binomial name
- Jacksonia grevilleoides Turcz.

= Jacksonia grevilleoides =

Species of legume

Jacksonia grevilleoides is a species of flowering plant in the family Fabaceae and is endemic to the south west of Western Australia. It is a prostrate or erect shrub with variably-shaped phylloclades, yellow-orange flowers and woody, densely hairy pods.

== Description ==
Jacksonia grevilleoides is a prostrate or erect shrub that typically grows up to 0.3–3 m (1 ft 0 in – 9 ft 10 in) high and 0.4–1 m (1 ft 4 in – 3 ft 3 in) wide, its branches greyish green and prominently ribbed. Its phylloclades are irregular in size and shape, often branched, 35–73 mm (1.4–2.9 in) long and 14–18.6 mm (0.55–0.73 in) wide, the lobes sharply-pointed. The leaves are reduced to egg-shaped, reddish-brown scales, 1.3–2.2 mm (0.051–0.087 in) long and 1.3–1.4 mm (0.051–0.055 in) wide. The flowers are attached singly on the lobes of phylloclades on a straight pedicel 1.1–3.1 mm (0.043–0.122 in) long. There are egg-shaped bracteoles with toothed edges, 0.8–2.1 mm (0.031–0.083 in) long and 0.6–0.9 mm (0.024–0.035 in) wide on the pedicels. The floral tube is 0.8–2.1 mm (0.031–0.083 in) long and the sepals are membranous, the lobes 9.8–12.5 mm (0.39–0.49 in) long, 1.6–2.8 mm (0.063–0.110 in) wide and fused at the base for 0.5–0.8 mm (0.020–0.031 in). The standard petal is yellow-orange, rarely with red markings, 4.5–7.3 mm (0.18–0.29 in) long and 5.0–8.8 mm (0.20–0.35 in) wide, the wings yellow-orange, 5.5–8.2 mm (0.22–0.32 in) long, and the keel yellow-orange, 5.0–6.7 mm (0.20–0.26 in) long. The filaments of the stamens are greenish white, 5.3–8.7 mm (0.21–0.34 in) long. Flowering occurs from November to April, and the fruit is a woody, densely hairy, narrowly elliptic pod, 7.9–9.5 mm (0.31–0.37 in) long and 2.7–3.0 mm (0.11–0.12 in) wide.

== Taxonomy ==
Jacksonia grevilleoides was first formally described in 1853 by Nikolai Turczaninow in the Bulletin de la Société Impériale des Naturalistes de Moscou from specimens collected by James Drummond. The specific epithet (grevilleoides) means 'Grevillea-like'.

== Distribution and habitat ==
This species of Jacksonia grows in sand or clay on flats and slopes in woodland or shrubland in the Stirling Range, Fitzgerald River National Park and at Cape Riche in the Avon Wheatbelt and Esperance Plains bioregions of south-western Western Australia.

== Conservation status ==
Jacksonia grevilleoides is listed as "not threatened" by the Government of Western Australia Department of Biodiversity, Conservation and Attractions.
