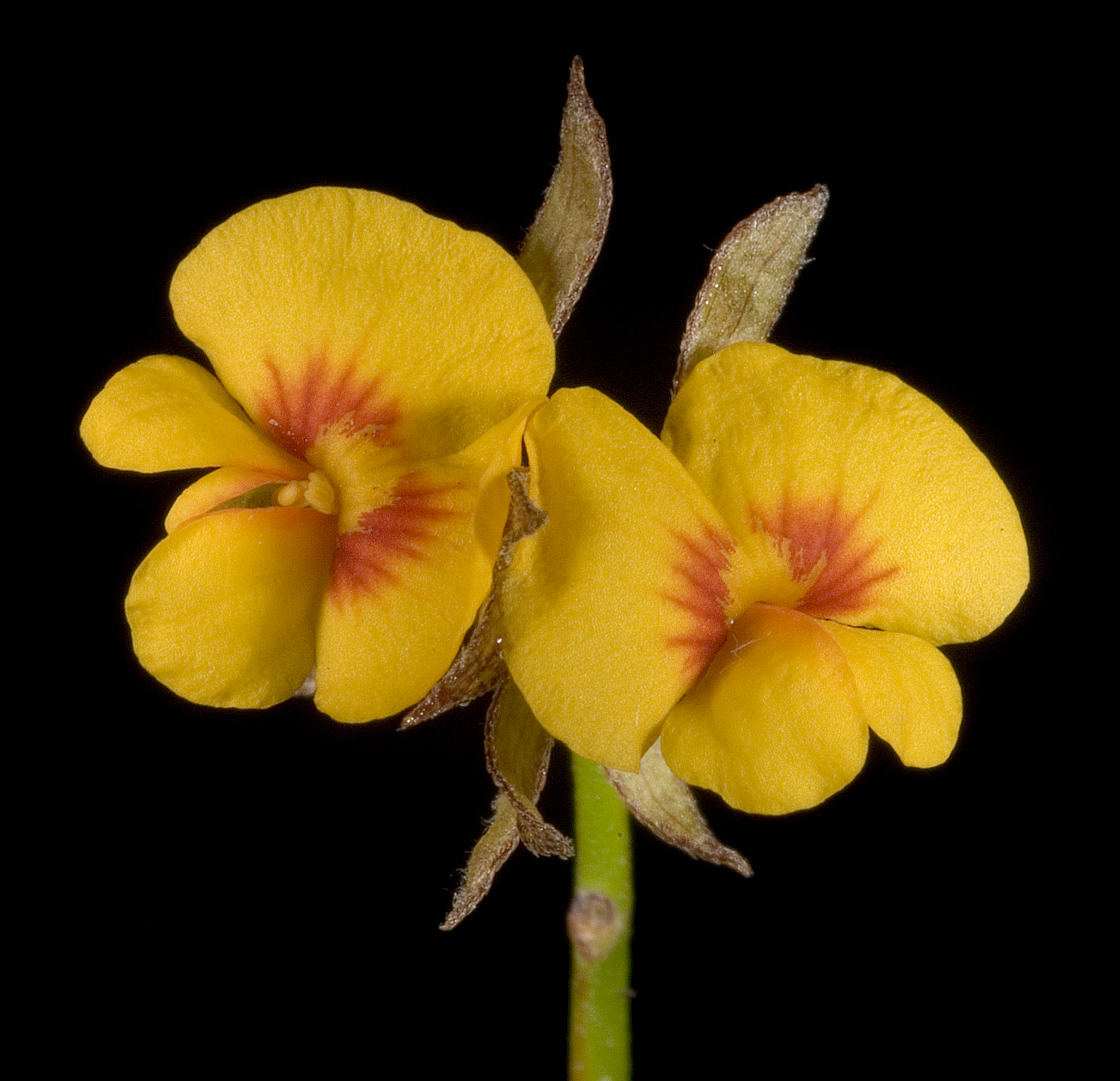

Scientific classification
- Kingdom: Plantae
- Clade: Tracheophytes
- Clade: Angiosperms
- Clade: Eudicots
- Clade: Rosids
- Order: Fabales
- Family: Fabaceae
- Subfamily: Faboideae
- Genus: Jacksonia
- Species: J. alata

Binomial name
- Jacksonia alata Benth.

Synonyms
- Jacksonia alata Benth. var. alata; Jacksonia alata var. flexuosa Meisn.; Piptomeris alata (Benth.) Greene

= Jacksonia alata =

Species of legume

Jacksonia alata is a species of flowering plant in the family Fabaceae and is endemic to the south-west of Western Australia. It is a tufted, semi-prostrate to erect shrub with flattened branches, sharply-pointed side branches or phylloclades, leaves reduced to narrowly lance-shaped scales, yellow-orange flowers with a red "eye", and woody, densely hairy pods.

== Description ==
Jacksonia alata is a tufted, semi-prostrate to erect shrub that typically grows up to 5–40 cm (2.0–15.7 in) high and 10–30 cm (3.9–11.8 in) wide. It has ribbed, flattened branches, the side branches sharply-pointed phylloclades 1.5–2.5 mm (0.059–0.098 in) wide. Its leaves are reduced to narrowly lance-shaped, dark brown scales, 0.8–2 mm (0.031–0.079 in) long and 0.6–0.9 mm (0.024–0.035 in) wide. The flowers are arranged at the ends of branches in raceme-like clusters on a pedicel 1.3–1.6 mm (0.051–0.063 in) long, with narrowly lance-shaped bracteoles 0.5–1.5 mm (0.020–0.059 in) long and 0.4–0.5 mm (0.016–0.020 in) wide near the top of the pedicels. The floral tube is 0.3–0.6 mm (0.012–0.024 in) long and the sepals are membranous, with lobes 3.0–5.7 mm (0.12–0.22 in) long and 0.8–2.0 mm (0.031–0.079 in) wide. The standard petal is yellow-orange with a red "eye", 3.2–4.7 mm (0.13–0.19 in) long, the wings yellow-orange with a red base, 3.3–4.2 mm (0.13–0.17 in) long, and the keel is yellow-orange or red, 2.1–3.6 mm (0.083–0.142 in) long. The stamens have white filaments with pink ends and are 1.3–3.5 mm (0.051–0.138 in) long. Flowering occurs from July to December, and the fruit is a woody, densely hairy pod 3.5–3.7 mm (0.14–0.15 in) long and 2.5–3.3 mm (0.098–0.130 in) wide.

== Taxonomy ==
Jacksonia alata was first formally described in 1837 by George Bentham in Stephan Endlicher's Enumeratio plantarum quas in Novae Hollandiae ora austro-occidentali ad fluvium Cygnorum et in sinu Regis Georgii collegit Carolus Liber Baro de Hügel. from specimens collected near King George Sound. The specific epithet (alata) means 'winged', referring to the stems.

== Distribution and habitat ==
This species of Jacksonia grows on granite outcrops, low slopes and hillsides on the Darling Scarp south from near Bindoon and in scattered places between Dunsborough to east of Esperance, in the Avon Wheatbelt, Esperance Plains, Jarrah Forest, Mallee, Swan Coastal Plain and Warren bioregions of south-western Western Australia.

== Conservation status ==
This species is listed as "not threatened" by the Government of Western Australia Department of Biodiversity, Conservation and Attractions.
