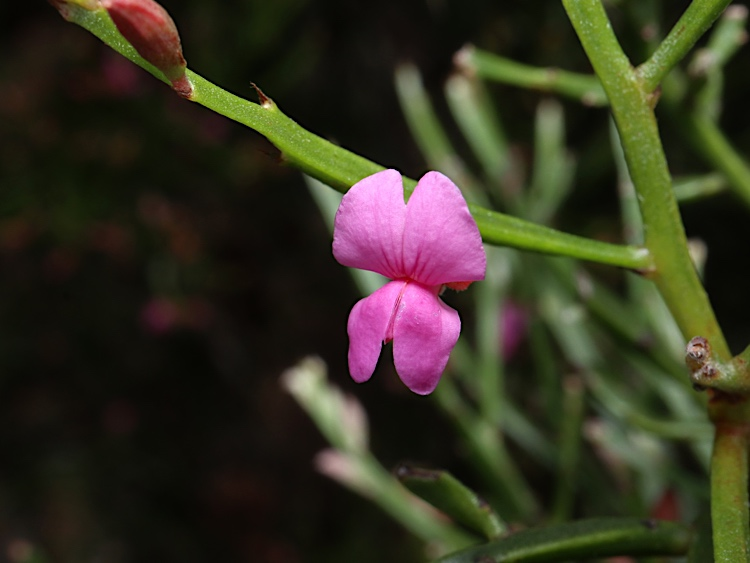

Scientific classification
- Kingdom: Plantae
- Clade: Tracheophytes
- Clade: Angiosperms
- Clade: Eudicots
- Clade: Rosids
- Order: Fabales
- Family: Fabaceae
- Subfamily: Faboideae
- Genus: Jacksonia
- Species: J. thesioides

Binomial name
- Jacksonia thesioides A.Cunn. ex Benth.

Synonyms
- Jacksonia purpurascens F.Muell.; Piptomeris purpuascens Greene orth. var.; Piptomeris purpurascens (F.Muell.) Greene; Piptomeris thesioides (A.Cunn. ex Benth.) Greene

= Jacksonia thesioides =

Species of legume

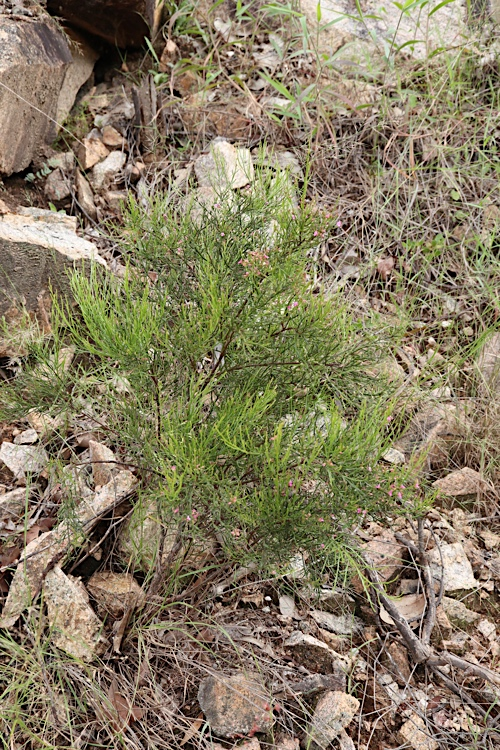
Habit in Paluma Range National Park

Jacksonia thesioides is a species of flowering plant in the family Fabaceae and is endemic to Queensland. It is an erect to prostrate shrub with dull green branches, the end branches sharply-pointed cladodes, leaves reduced to dark brown, egg-shaped scales with sharply-pointed tips, hot pink to mauve flowers, sometimes with red markings, arranged along the branches, and woody, densely hairy, elliptic pods.

== Description ==
Jacksonia thesioides is an erect to prostrate, coarse to slender shrub that typically grows up to 0.1–4 m (3.9 in – 13 ft 1.5 in) high and 1–3 m (3 ft 3 in – 9 ft 10 in) wide. It has dull green branches, the end branches sharply-pointed cladodes, its leaves reduced to egg-shaped, dark brown scales, 0.8–1.6 mm (0.031–0.063 in) long and 0.4–1 mm (0.016–0.039 in) wide with a sharply-pointed tip. The flowers are sparsely arranged along the branches on pedicels 1.1–1.5 mm (0.043–0.059 in) long, with egg-shaped bracteoles 0.7–1.0 mm (0.028–0.039 in) long and 0.2–0.6 mm (0.0079–0.0236 in) wide below the sepals. The floral tube is 0.8–1.5 mm (0.031–0.059 in) long and is ribbed, and the sepals are membranous, with upper lobes 2.1–2.3 mm (0.083–0.091 in) long, 0.9–1.0 mm (0.035–0.039 in) wide and fused for 1.1–1.9 mm (0.043–0.075 in). The flowers are hot pink to mauve, the standard petal 2.2–4.1 mm (0.087–0.161 in) long and 3–4.8 mm (0.12–0.19 in) deep, the wings 3.5–4.0 mm (0.14–0.16 in) long, and the keel 2.9–3.5 mm (0.11–0.14 in) long. The stamens have green filaments, 1.3–3.1 mm (0.051–0.122 in) long. Flowering occurs throughout the year, and the fruit is a woody, elliptic, densely hairy pod 4.0–5.5 mm (0.16–0.22 in) long and 1.8–2.7 mm (0.071–0.106 in) wide.

== Taxonomy ==
Jacksonia thesioides was first formally described in 1837 by George Bentham from an unpublished description by Allan Cunningham from specimens collected by Cunningham near the Endeavour River. The specific epithet (thesioides) means 'Thesium-like'.

== Distribution and habitat ==
This species of Jacksonia grows in woodland in sandy soil over granite or sandstone in north-eastern Queensland, south to Townsville and on Torres Strait Islands.

== Conservation status ==
Jacksonia thesioides is listed as of "least concern" under the Queensland Government Nature Conservation Act 1992.
