= Jacksonia carduacea =

Conservation status
- Priority Three — Poorly Known Taxa (DEC)

Scientific classification
- Kingdom: Plantae
- Clade: Tracheophytes
- Clade: Angiosperms
- Clade: Eudicots
- Clade: Rosids
- Order: Fabales
- Family: Fabaceae
- Subfamily: Faboideae
- Genus: Jacksonia
- Species: J. carduacea

Binomial name
- Jacksonia carduacea Meisn.

Synonyms
- Piptomeris carduacea (Meisn.) Greene

Species of legume

Jacksonia carduacea is a species of flowering plant in the family Fabaceae and is endemic to the south-west of Western Australia. It is a bushy shrub with its end-branches elliptic to egg-shaped phylloclades, and yellow-orange flowers in clusters in the axils of phylloclades.

== Description ==
Jacksonia carduacea is an erect, bushy shrub that typically grows up to 20–50 cm (7.9–19.7 in) high and 0.5–1.5 m (1 ft 8 in – 4 ft 11 in) wide. It has cream-coloured branches, the end branches elliptic or egg-shaped phyllodes 6–31 mm (0.24–1.22 in) long and 3.5–10 mm (0.14–0.39 in) wide, its leaves narrowly egg-shaped to lance-shaped, 5–9 mm (0.20–0.35 in) long and 0.8–2.2 mm (0.031–0.087 in) wide. The flowers are arranged in clusters in the axils of phylloclades, each flower sessile or on a pedicel up to 1.9 mm (0.075 in) long, with narrowly egg-shaped bracteoles 6–10 mm (0.24–0.39 in) long and 0.6–1.3 mm (0.024–0.051 in) wide with toothed edges. The floral tube is 0.5–0.9 mm (0.020–0.035 in) long and the sepals are membraneous, with lobes 11.5–18.5 mm (0.45–0.73 in) long and 1.4–2.2 mm (0.055–0.087 in) wide. The standard petal is yellow-orange with a small red "eye", 8.3–9.2 mm (0.33–0.36 in) long and 7.3–8.0 mm (0.29–0.31 in) wide, the wings yellow-orange, 6.8–7.7 mm (0.27–0.30 in) long, and the keel yellow-orange, 6.0–6.2 mm (0.24–0.24 in) long. The stamens have greenish-white to pink filaments and are 5.5–7.8 mm (0.22–0.31 in) long. Flowering occurs from August to December, and the fruit is a woody, densely hairy pod 8.2–10 mm (0.32–0.39 in) long and 3.6–4.5 mm (0.14–0.18 in) wide.

== Taxonomy ==
Jacksonia carduacea was first formally described in 1855 by Carl Meissner in his Botanische Zeitung from specimens collected by James Drummond. The specific epithet (carduacea) means 'resembling thistles', referring to the leaves.

== Distribution and habitat ==
This species of Jacksonia grows in sandy soils in shrubland in the Alexander Morrison National Park, north-east and south-west of Badgingarra, in the Geraldton Sandplains and Swan Coastal Plain bioregions in the south-west of Western Australia.

== Conservation status ==
This species is listed as "Priority Three" meaning that it is poorly known and known from only a few locations but is not under imminent threat.
