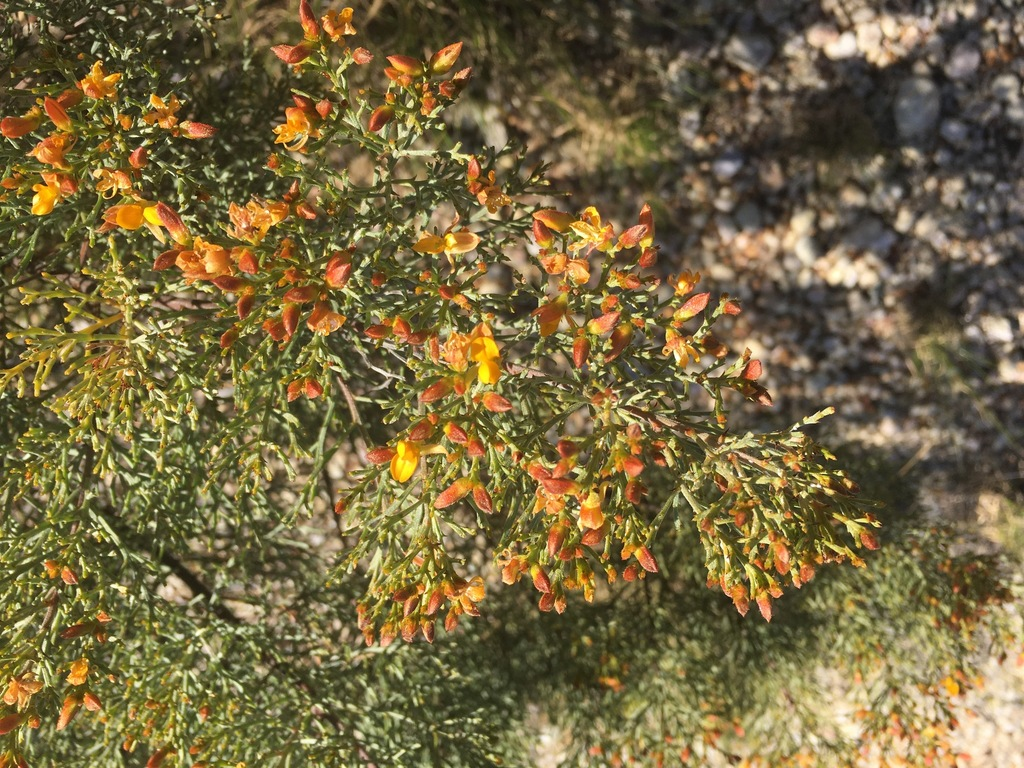
- In White Mountains National Park

Scientific classification
- Kingdom: Plantae
- Clade: Tracheophytes
- Clade: Angiosperms
- Clade: Eudicots
- Clade: Rosids
- Order: Fabales
- Family: Fabaceae
- Subfamily: Faboideae
- Genus: Jacksonia
- Species: J. ramosissima

Binomial name
- Jacksonia ramosissima Benth.

Synonyms
- Piptomeris ramosissima (Benth.) Greene

= Jacksonia ramosissima =

Species of legume

Jacksonia ramosissima is a species of flowering plant in the family Fabaceae and is endemic to Queensland. It is an erect, densely-branching, soft shrub with leaves reduced to egg-shaped, greyish scales, yellow-orange flowers densely arranged near the ends of branches, and woody, elliptical fruit densely covered with white hairs.

== Description ==
Jacksonia ramosissima is an erect, densely-branching, soft shrub that typically grows up to 0.25–2.5 m (9.8 in – 8 ft 2.4 in) high and 1–2 m (3 ft 3 in – 6 ft 7 in) wide. It has dull green or greyish-green branches, the end branches 2.5–25 mm (0.098–0.984 in) long and 0.4–0.5 mm (0.016–0.020 in) long. Its leaves are reduced to egg-shaped scales, 0.6–2.3 mm (0.024–0.091 in) long and 0.4–0.9 mm (0.016–0.035 in) wide. The flowers are densely arranged near the ends of branches, each flower on a pedicel 1.3–1.9 mm (0.051–0.075 in) long, with broadly lance-shaped bracteoles 1.7–2.3 mm (0.067–0.091 in) long and 0.8–1.0 mm (0.031–0.039 in) wide. The floral tube is 1.3–1.5 mm (0.051–0.059 in) long and the sepals are membraneous, the upper lobes 2.8–3.7 mm (0.11–0.15 in) long and 1.3–1.6 mm (0.051–0.063 in) wide, the lower lobes longer and narrower. The flowers are yellow-orange, the standard petal 4.7–5.5 mm (0.19–0.22 in) long and 4.4–4.7 mm (0.17–0.19 in) wide, the wings 5.4–6.4 mm (0.21–0.25 in) long, and the keel 5.2–6.3 mm (0.20–0.25 in) long. The stamens have green to pink filaments and are 4.3–6.5 mm (0.17–0.26 in) long. Flowering occurs from May to October, and the fruit is a woody, elliptic pod 5.0–7.5 mm (0.20–0.30 in) long and 2.7–3.5 mm (0.11–0.14 in) wide and densely covered with white hairs.

== Taxonomy ==
Jacksonia ramosissima was first formally described in 1848 by George Bentham in Thomas Mitchell Journal of an Expedition into the Interior of Tropical Australia. The specific epithet (ramosissima) means 'much branched'.

== Distribution and habitat ==
This species of Jacksonia grows in woodland in sandy loam over sandstone or laterite in northern inland Queensland.

== Conservation status ==
This species is listed as of "least concern" by the Queensland Government Nature Conservation Act 1992.
