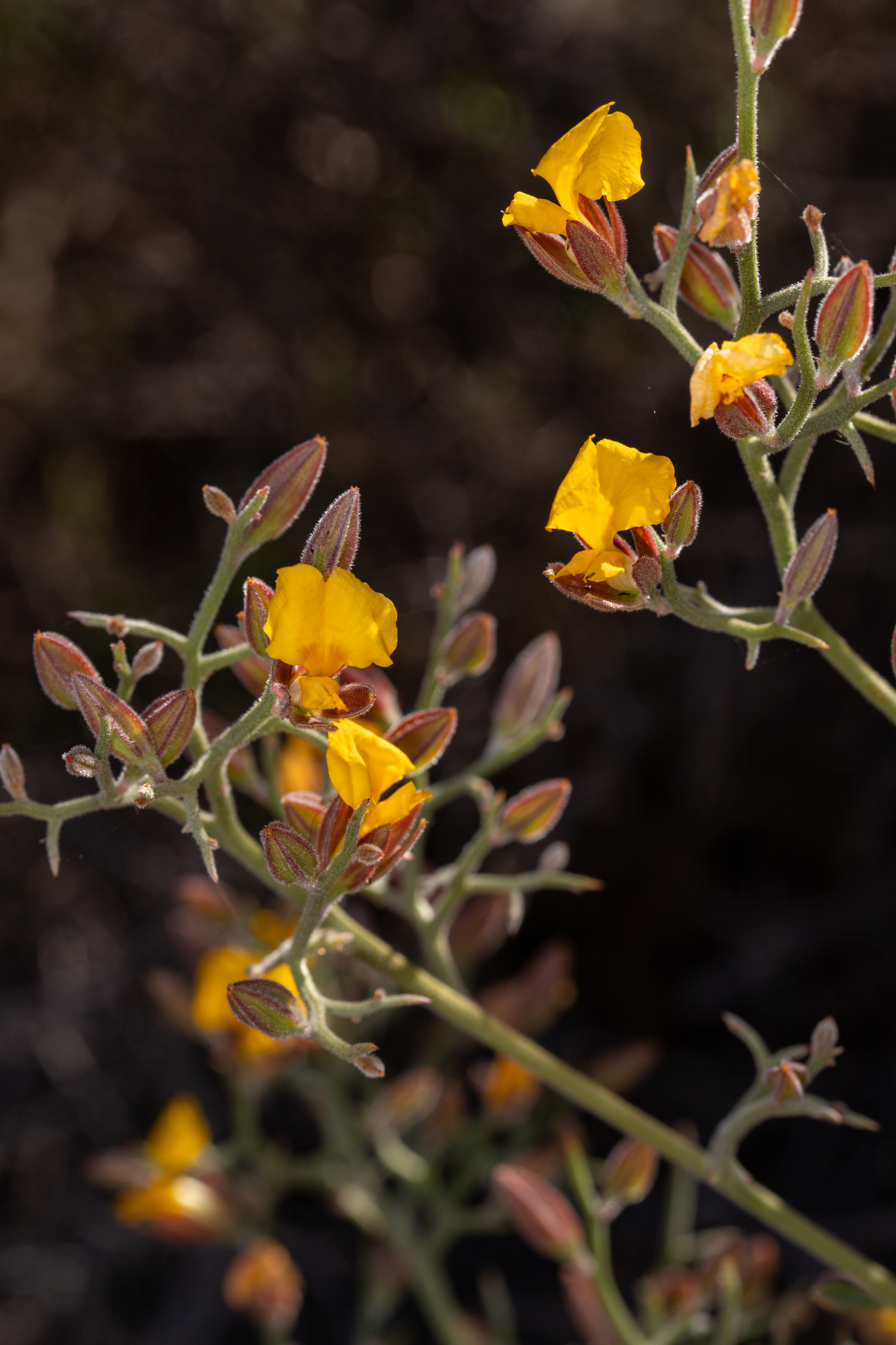
- Near Wongan Hills

Scientific classification
- Kingdom: Plantae
- Clade: Tracheophytes
- Clade: Angiosperms
- Clade: Eudicots
- Clade: Rosids
- Order: Fabales
- Family: Fabaceae
- Subfamily: Faboideae
- Genus: Jacksonia
- Species: J. macrocalyx

Binomial name
- Jacksonia macrocalyx Meisn.

= Jacksonia macrocalyx =

Species of legume

Jacksonia macrocalyx is a species of flowering plant in the family Fabaceae and is endemic to the south-west of Western Australia. It is an erect shrub with greyish-green branches, short, sharply-pointed phylloclades, leaves reduced to scales leaves, yellow flowers, and woody, hairy pods.

== Description ==
Jacksonia macrocalyx is an erect shrub that typically grows to 0.3–1.0 m (1 ft 0 in – 3 ft 3 in) high and 0.7–1.5 m (2 ft 4 in – 4 ft 11 in) wide. Its branches are greyish-geen, with sharply-pointed phylloclades 1.5–20 mm (0.059–0.787 in) long and 0.3–0.9 mm (0.012–0.035 in) wide. Its leaves are reduced to mid-brown, broadly egg-shaped scales, 0.5–2.5 mm (0.020–0.098 in) long and 0.5–1.2 mm (0.020–0.047 in) wide. The flowers are scattered near the ends of branches on a pedicel 2.5–4.0 mm (0.098–0.157 in) long, with narrowly lance-shaped bracteoles 1.5–1.8 mm (0.059–0.071 in) long on the upper part of the pedicels. The floral tube is 1.3–1.5 mm (0.051–0.059 in) long and the sepals are papery, with lobes 9.0–11.3 mm (0.35–0.44 in) long and 2.7–4.0 mm (0.11–0.16 in) wide. The flowers are yellow, the standard petal 8.7–10.3 mm (0.34–0.41 in) long and 12.6–17 mm (0.50–0.67 in) broad, the wings 11–14.1 mm (0.43–0.56 in) long, and the keel 5.2–5.5 mm (0.20–0.22 in) long. The stamens have white to pale green filaments 2.4–7 mm (0.094–0.276 in) long. Flowering occurs from June to February, and the fruit is a woody hairy, broadly elliptical pod 4.5–7 mm (0.18–0.28 in) long and 2.8–3.8 mm (0.11–0.15 in) wide.

== Taxonomy ==
Jacksonia macrocalyx was first formally described in 1855 by Carl Meissner in the journal Botanische Zeitung from specimens collected by James Drummond. The specific epithet (macrocalyx) means 'long sepals'.

== Distribution and habitat ==
This species of Jacksonia grows in shrubland on sand over laterite from north of Mingenew to Wongan Hills in the Avon Wheatbelt and Geraldton Sandplains bioregions of south-western Western Australia.

== Conservation status ==
Jacksonia macrocalyx is listed as "not threatened" by the Government of Western Australia Department of Biodiversity, Conservation and Attractions.
