= Jennifer Anne Chappill =

Australian botanist

Jennifer Anne Chappill (born 26 July 1959 in Melbourne – died 8 August 2006 in Perth) was an Australian botanist. Chappill studied botany at the University of Melbourne and was awarded a Master of Science degree in 1983, and a PhD in 1988 studying under Pauline Ladiges. From 1991 Chappill was a lecturer in botany at the University of Western Australia.
