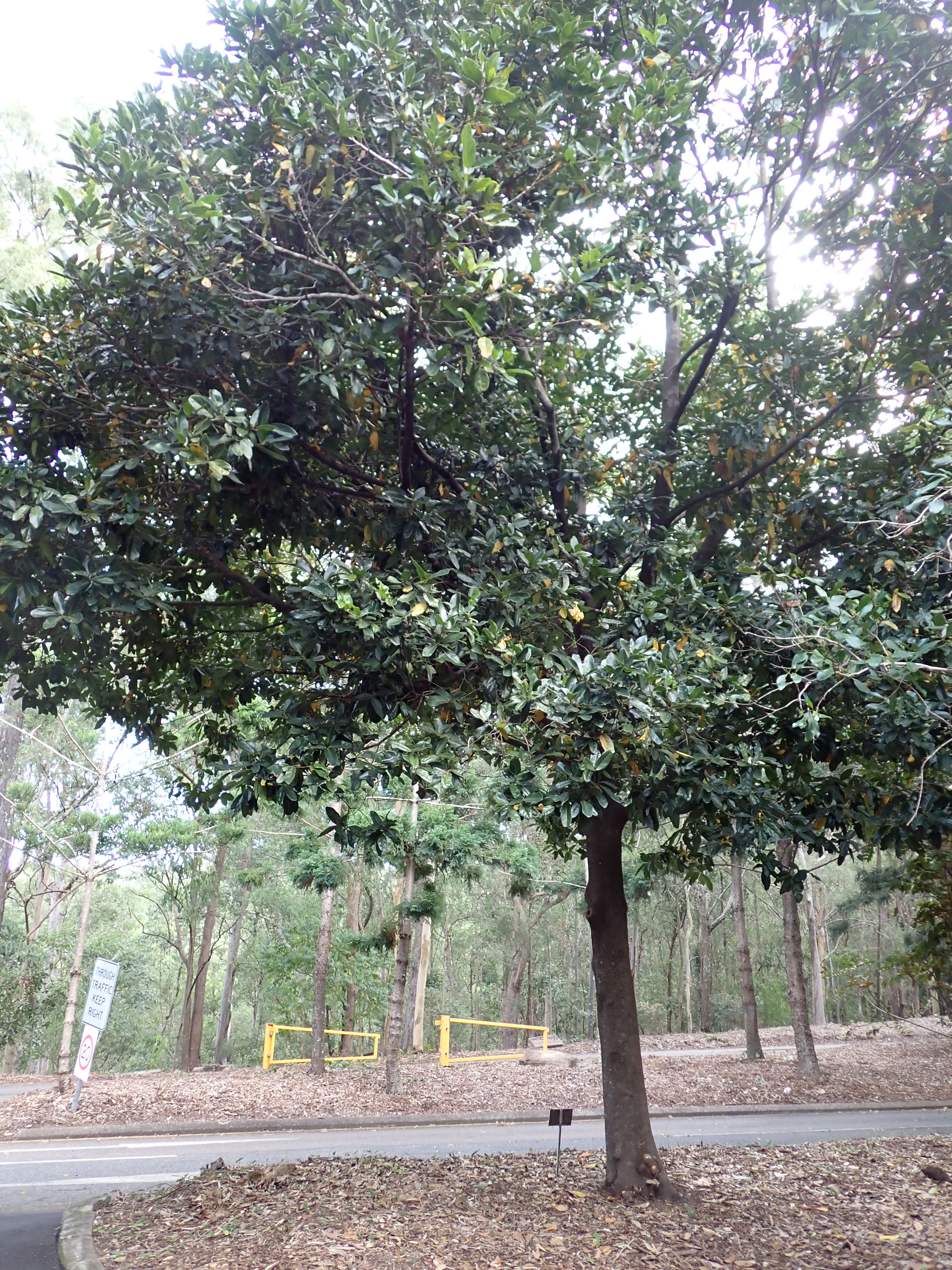
- In Mount Coot-tha Botanic Gardens

Conservation status
- Least Concern (IUCN 3.1)

Scientific classification
- Kingdom: Plantae
- Clade: Tracheophytes
- Clade: Angiosperms
- Clade: Magnoliids
- Order: Laurales
- Family: Lauraceae
- Genus: Cryptocarya
- Species: C. cunninghamii

Binomial name
- Cryptocarya cunninghamii Meisn.

Synonyms
- Cryptocarya glaucescens var. cunninghamii (Meisn.) Benth.; Cryptocarya glaucescens auct. non R.Br.: Gardner, C.A. (June 1930)

= Cryptocarya cunninghamii =

Cunningham's laurel

Species of tree

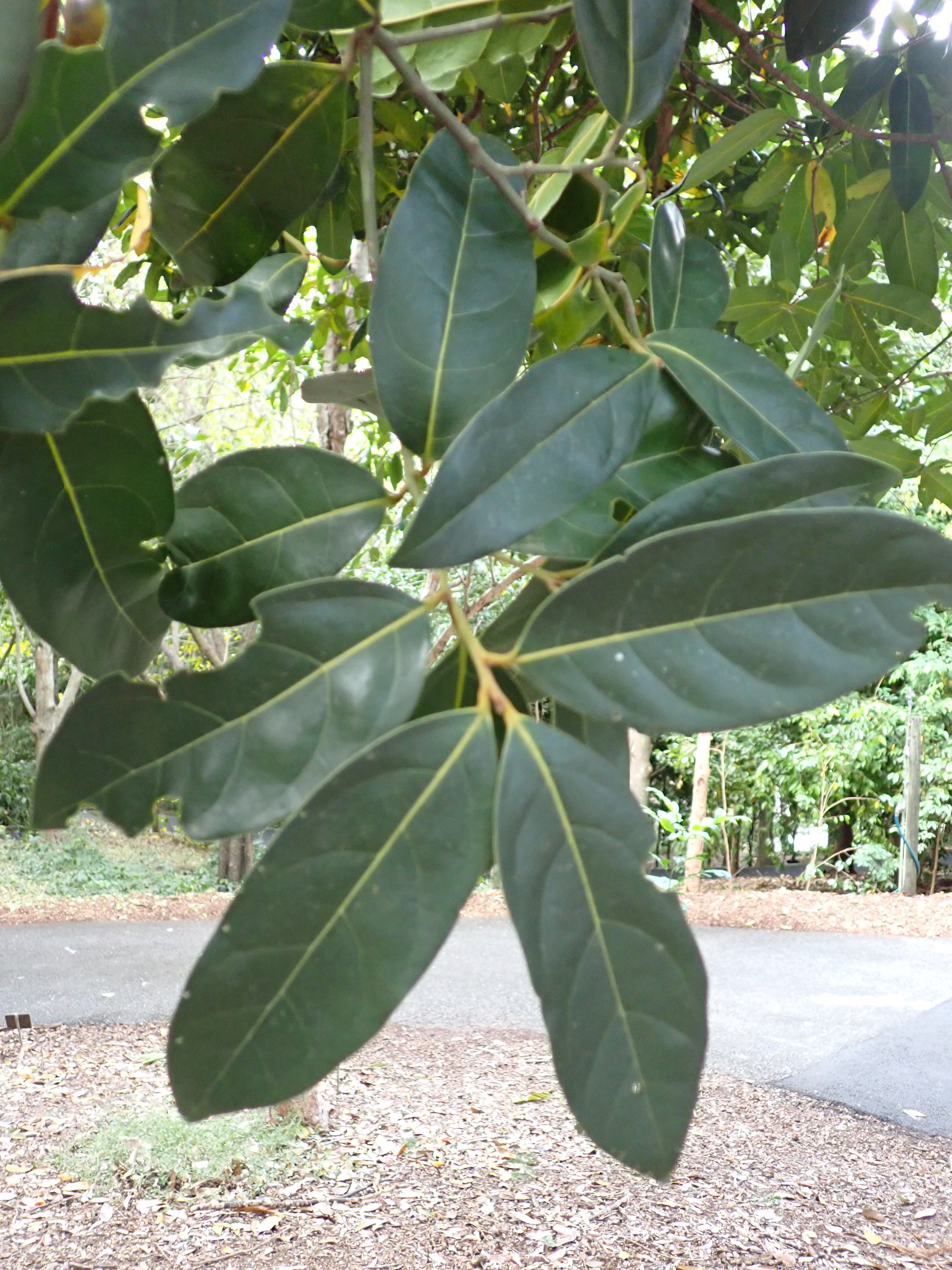
Foliage

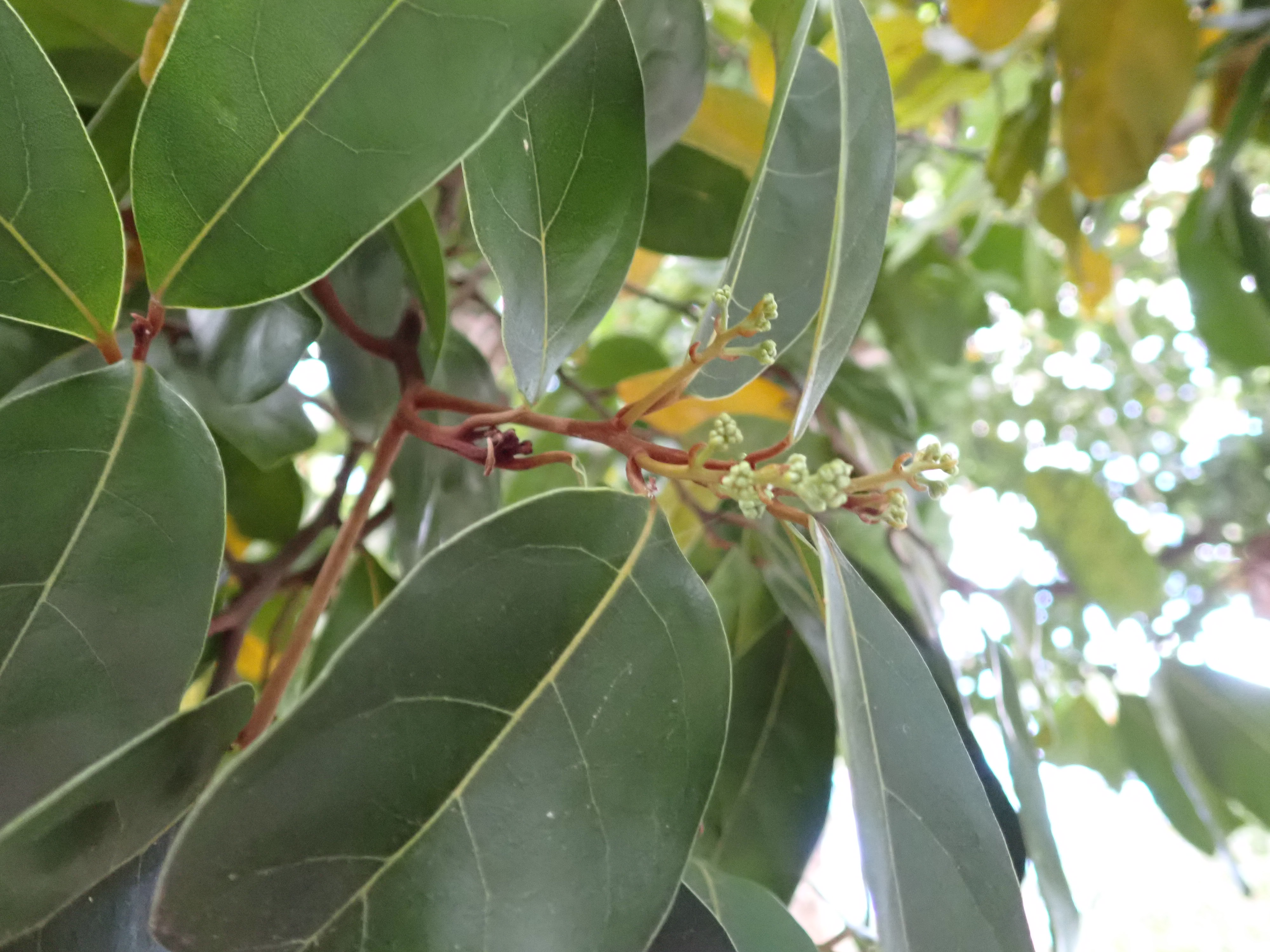
Flower buds

Cryptocarya cunninghamii, commonly known as Cunningham's laurel or coconut laurel, is a species of flowering plant in the laurel family and is endemic to northern Australia. It is a tree with oblong to elliptic leaves, the flowers creamy-green and tube-shaped, and the fruit a spherical black to purplish-blackdrupe.

== Description ==
Cryptocarya cunninghamii is a tree that typically grows to a height of up to 25 m (82 ft), its stem sometimes buttressed. Its leaves are oblong to elliptic, 65–135 mm (2.6–5.3 in) long and 24–56 mm (0.94–2.20 in) wide on a petiole 5–12 mm (0.20–0.47 in) long. The flowers are creamy-green, unpleasantly perfumed, and arranged in panicles usually shorter than the leaves. The perianth tube is 1.0–1.5 mm (0.039–0.059 in) long and 1.2–1.7 mm (0.047–0.067 in) wide, the tepals 1.3–2.0 mm (0.051–0.079 in) long, 0.9–1.1 mm (0.035–0.043 in) wide and hairy. The outer anthers are 0.7–0.8 mm (0.028–0.031 in) long and 0.5–0.6 mm (0.020–0.024 in) wide and glabrous, the inner anthers 0.4–0.7 mm (0.016–0.028 in) long. Flowering occurs from May to October, and the fruit is a spherical black to purplish-black drupe 13–15 mm (0.51–0.59 in) long and 13–16 mm (0.51–0.63 in) wide.

== Taxonomy ==
Cryptocarya cunninghamii was first formally described in 1864 by Carl Meissner in de Candolle's Prodromus Systematis Naturalis Regni Vegetabilis from specimens collected by Allan Cunningham near the Hunter River.

== Distribution and habitat ==
Cunningham's laurel grows in shallow or rocky soils in gorges with sandstone boulders, in coastal lowland rainforest and monsoon rainforest at elevations from sea level to 500 m (1,600 ft), in the Northern Kimberley and Victoria Bonaparte bioregions of Western Australia, the Arnhem Coast, Arnhem Plateau, Daly Basin, Darwin Coastal, Pine Creek, Tiwi Cobourg and Victoria Bonaparte bioregions of the Northern Territory, and the Cape York Peninsula, Wet Tropics and Hinchinbrook Island of Queensland. It probably also occurs in New Guinea.
