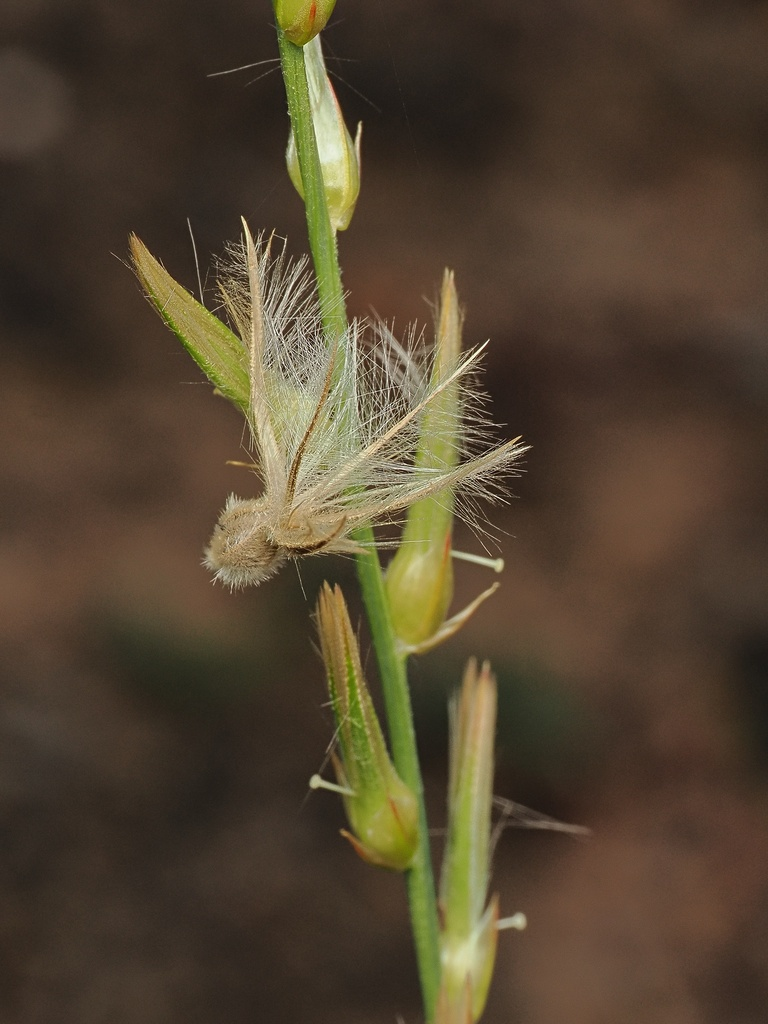
- Near Charles Darwin National Park

Scientific classification
- Kingdom: Plantae
- Clade: Tracheophytes
- Clade: Angiosperms
- Clade: Eudicots
- Order: Caryophyllales
- Family: Amaranthaceae
- Genus: Ptilotus
- Species: P. distans

Binomial name
- Ptilotus distans (RF.Br.) Poir.

Synonyms
- Ptilotus distans (R.Br.) Poir. subsp. distans; Trichinium distans R.Br.

= Ptilotus distans =

Species of grass-like plant

Ptilotus distans is a species of flowering plant in the family Amaranthaceae and is endemic to the north-west of Australia. It is an erect perennial herb, with linear stem leaves and cylindrical green or brown spikes of glabrous, colourless flowers.

== Description ==
Ptilotus distans is an erect, perennial herb that typically grows to a height of up to 0.8–1.0 m (2 ft 7 in – 3 ft 3 in) tall, its stems glabrous. The leaves are arranged on the stems, 20–90 mm (0.79–3.54 in) long and 0.7–2 mm (0.028–0.079 in) wide. The flowers are arranged in cylindrical spikes 50–300 mm (2.0–11.8 in) long and 10–30 mm (0.39–1.18 in) wide with egg-shaped bracts and bracteoles up to 5.2 mm (0.20 in) long and 1.5 mm (0.059 in) wide. The outer two tepals are slightly longer and wider than the inner tepals, up to 15 mm (0.59 in) long and about 1 mm (0.039 in) wide. The style is 1.2 mm (0.047 in) long and curved. Flowering occurs throughout the year with a peak in October and the seeds are dull orange or pale brown, 2.7–2.9 mm (0.11–0.11 in) long.

== Taxonomy ==
This species was first formally described in 1810 by Robert Brown who gave it the name Trichinium distans in his Prodromus Florae Novae Hollandiae et Insulae Van Diemen. In 1816, Poiret transferred the species to Ptilotus as P. distans in a supplement to the Encyclopédie Méthodique. The specific epithet (distans) means 'standing apart', referring to the well-spaced flowers.

== Distribution and habitat ==
Ptilotus distans is found in the Darwin Coastal and Northern Kimberley bioregions of northern Western Australia where it grows in lateritic scree, and in the Arnhem Coast, Arnhem Plateau, Central Arnhem, Daly Basin, Darwin Coastal, Gulf Fall and Uplands, Pine Creek, Tiwi Cobourg and Victoria Bonaparte bioregions of the Northern Territory, where it grows in a range of habitats.

== Conservation status ==
This species of Ptilotus is listed as "not threatened" by the Government of Western Australia Department of Biodiversity, Conservation and Attractions, and as of "least concern" under the Territory Parks and Wildlife Conservation Act.

== See also ==
- List of Ptilotus species
