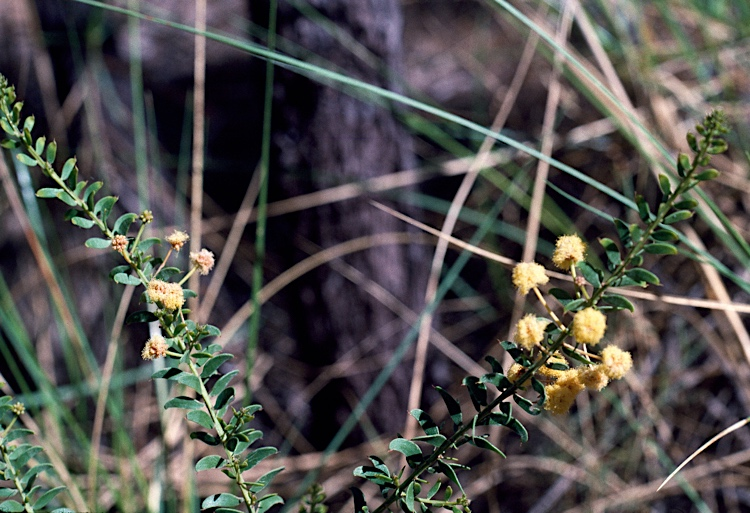
- Near Tolmer Falls in Litchfield National Park

Scientific classification
- Kingdom: Plantae
- Clade: Tracheophytes
- Clade: Angiosperms
- Clade: Eudicots
- Clade: Rosids
- Order: Fabales
- Family: Fabaceae
- Subfamily: Caesalpinioideae
- Clade: Mimosoid clade
- Genus: Acacia
- Species: A. nuperrima

Binomial name
- Acacia nuperrima Baker f.
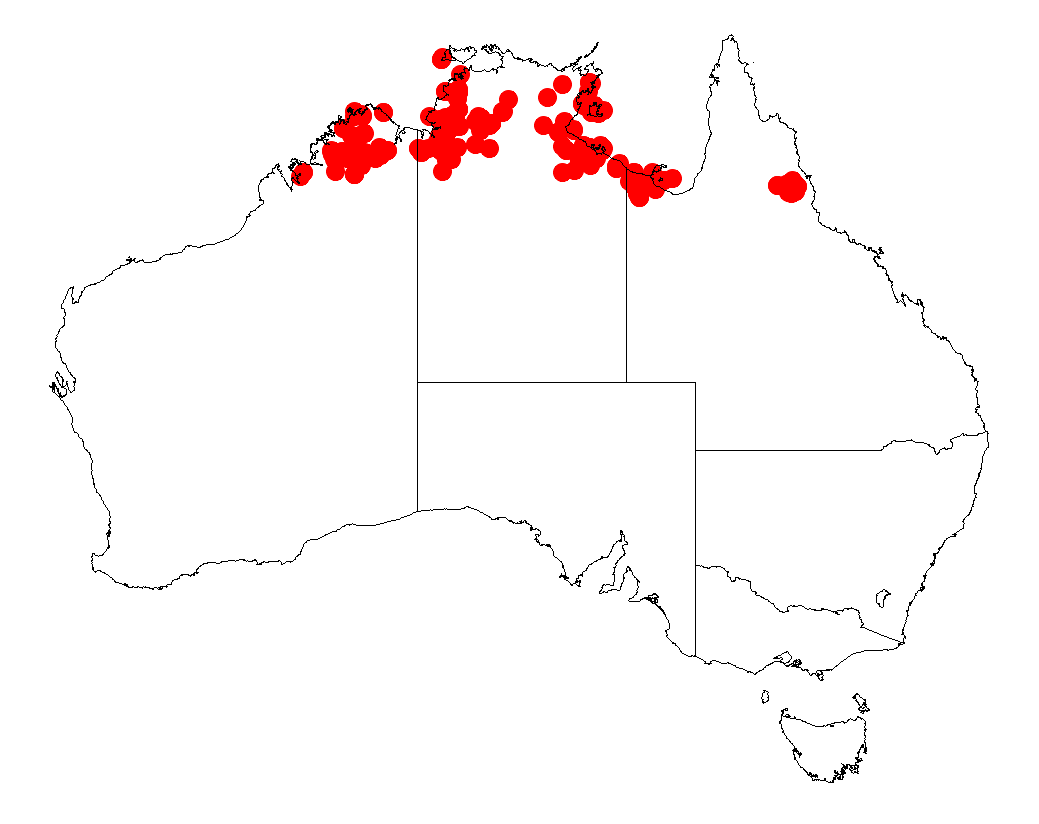
- Occurrence data from AVH

Synonyms
- Acacia nuperrima Baker f. subsp. nuperrima; ? Acacia translucens var. ? oblonga Benth.; Acacia translucens var. angusta Domin; Acacia translucens var. angustata A.D.Chapm. orth. var.; Racosperma nuperrimum (Baker f.) Pedley

= Acacia nuperrima =

Species of legume

Acacia nuperrima is a species of flowering plant in the family Fabaceae, and is endemic to northern Australia. It is an erect to prostrate, often spreading shrub with angular branchlets, narrowly elliptic, more or less linear and flat phyllodes, heads of golden yellow flowers and erect, narrowly lance-shaped to linear pods.

== Description ==
Acacia nuperrima is a glabrous, resinous, erect, ascending to semi-prostrate, often spreading shrub that typically grows to a height of up to 1 m (3 ft 3 in) and often has many slender branches at the base. The bark is grey or brown, smooth to slightly fissured at the base. The branchlets are angular towards the end and have scalloped resin-encrusted edges and fine lenticels. The phyllodes are curved or straight, triangular, narrowly elliptic to linear, 7–20 mm (0.28–0.79 in) long, 1.5–3 mm (0.059–0.118 in) wide and leathery, sometimes downward curved and slightly wavy. The flowers are arranged in spherical heads on peduncles 7–15 mm (0.28–0.59 in) long, each head 4–7 mm (0.16–0.28 in) in diameter with 10 to 20 golden yellow to pale yellow flowers. Flowering occurs in most months, and the pods are erect, sessile, narrowly lance-shaped with the narrower end towards the base, 22–67 mm (0.87–2.64 in) long, 3–5 mm (0.12–0.20 in) wide, woody, resinous and glabrous. The seeds are flattened oblong, 4.5–5 mm (0.18–0.20 in) long and 1.7–2.2 mm (0.067–0.087 in) wide with a narrowly conical aril.

== Taxonomy ==
Acacia nuperrima was first formally described in 1926 by Edmund Gilbert Baker in the Journal of Botany, British and Foreign from specimens collected on Groote Eylandt. The specific epithet (nuperrima) means 'latest' or 'recent', presumably because it was the latest in the genus, a "distinction that did not last long".

== Distribution and habitat ==
This species of wattle grows in sandy, rocky, lateritic or red loam soils on plains, ridges or undulating country in shrubland, woodland or sometimes open forest in the Kimberley region of Western Australia, the north of the Northern Territory, on offshore island in the Gulf of Carpentaria, and in the Corinda area of north-western Queensland. In Western Australia it is common around Cape Londonderry, Derby and Fitzroy River areas in the Central Kimberley, Northern Kimberley and Victoria Bonaparte bioregions, in the Arnhem Coast, Arnhem Plateau, Central Arnhem, Central Kimberley, Daly Basin, Darwin Coastal, Einasleigh Uplands, Gulf Coastal, Gulf Fall and Uplands, Gulf Plains, Ord Victoria Plain, Pine Creek, Sturt Plateau, Tiwi Cobourg, Victoria Bonaparte bioregions of the Northern Territory.

== See also ==
- List of Acacia species
