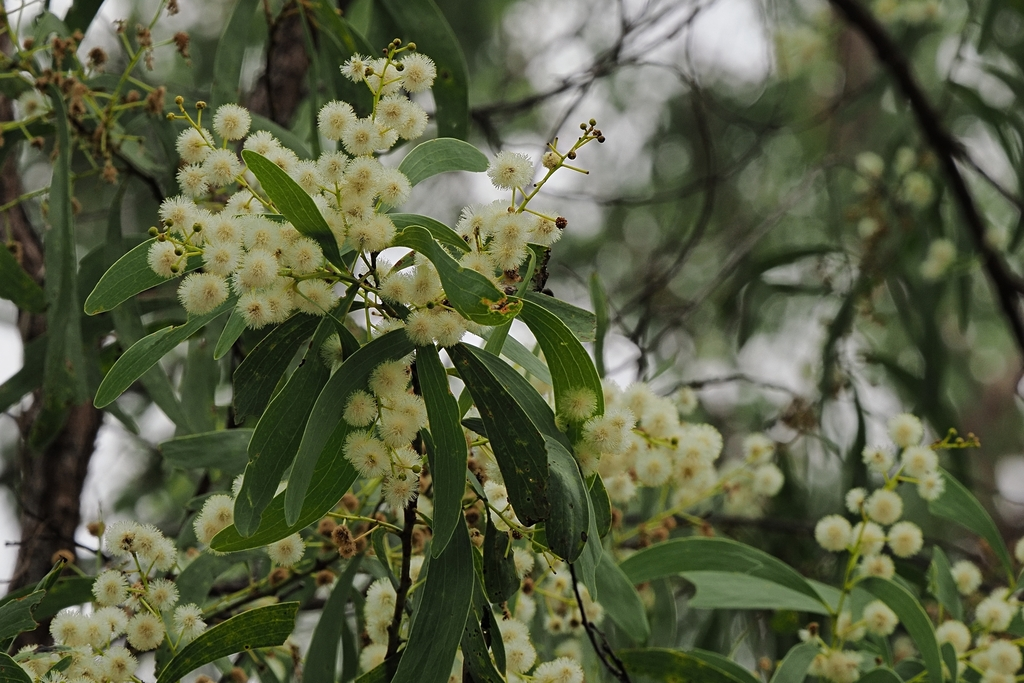
- In Charles Darwin National Park

Conservation status
- Least Concern (TPWCA)

Scientific classification
- Kingdom: Plantae
- Clade: Embryophytes
- Clade: Tracheophytes
- Clade: Spermatophytes
- Clade: Angiosperms
- Clade: Eudicots
- Clade: Rosids
- Order: Fabales
- Family: Fabaceae
- Subfamily: Caesalpinioideae
- Clade: Mimosoid clade
- Genus: Acacia
- Species: A. latescens

Binomial name
- Acacia latescens Benth.
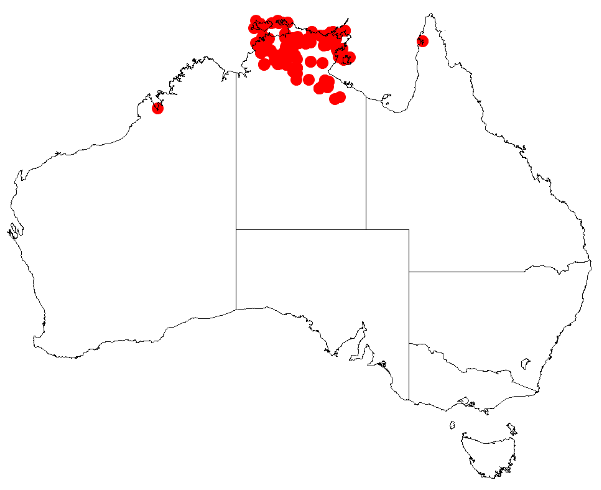
- Occurrence data from AVH

Synonyms
- Acacia dineura F.Muell.; Acacia dissoneura F.Muell.; Acacia latescens Benth. var. latescens; Racosperma latescens (Benth.) Pedley

= Acacia latescens =

Species of legume

Acacia latescens, also known as ball wattle, is a species of flowering plant in the family Fabaceae and is endemic to the Northern Territory where it is common in the Top End. It is a shrub or tree with rough, fissured bark, glabrous branchlets, usually narrowly elliptic to narrowly oblong or more or less linear phyllodes, spherical heads of cream-coloured to pale yellow flowers and mostly narrowly oblong, flat, leathery pods.

== Description ==
Acacia latescens is a shrub or tree that typically grows to a height of 3–10 m (9.8–32.8 ft) and has rough, brown or dark grey fissured bark and glabrous branchlets. The phyllodes are narrowly elliptic to narrowly oblong or linear, sometimes tending lance-shaped with the narrower end towards the base, often sickle-shaped, 80–260 mm (3.1–10.2 in) long and 5–20 mm (0.20–0.79 in) wide on a pulvinus 2–4 mm (0.079–0.157 in) long. The phyllodes have two main veins, sometimes up to three, and there are three or four glands often projecting slightly. The flowers are borne in four to eleven spherical heads in racemes 10–30 mm (0.39–1.18 in) long, each heads on a glabrous peduncle 6–17 mm (0.24–0.67 in) long. The heads are 4–6 mm (0.16–0.24 in) in diameter, with 30 to 35 cream-coloured to pale yellow flowers. Flowering occurs from April to July, and the pods are mostly narrowly oblong, flat, leathery, up to 150 mm (5.9 in) long and 12–15 mm (0.47–0.59 in) wide.

== Taxonomy ==
Acacia latescens was first formally described in 1842 by George Bentham in Hooker's London Journal of Botany from a specimen collected by Allan Cunningham on May-Day Island in Van Diemen Gulf.

== Distribution and habitat ==
This species of wattle is found in the northern Northern Territory in the Arnhem Coast, Arnhem Plateau, Central Arnhem, Daly Basin, Darwin Coastal, Gulf Fall and Uplands, Pine Creek, Sturt Plateau, Tiwi Cobourg, and Victoria Bonaparte bioregions of the Northern Territory where it grows in sandy and lateritic soils in open forest, woodland and shrubland, rarely in coastal dunes.
