= Acacia cataractae =

Scientific classification
- Kingdom: Plantae
- Clade: Tracheophytes
- Clade: Angiosperms
- Clade: Eudicots
- Clade: Rosids
- Order: Fabales
- Family: Fabaceae
- Subfamily: Caesalpinioideae
- Clade: Mimosoid clade
- Genus: Acacia
- Species: A. cataractae

Binomial name
- Acacia cataractae Tindale & Kodela
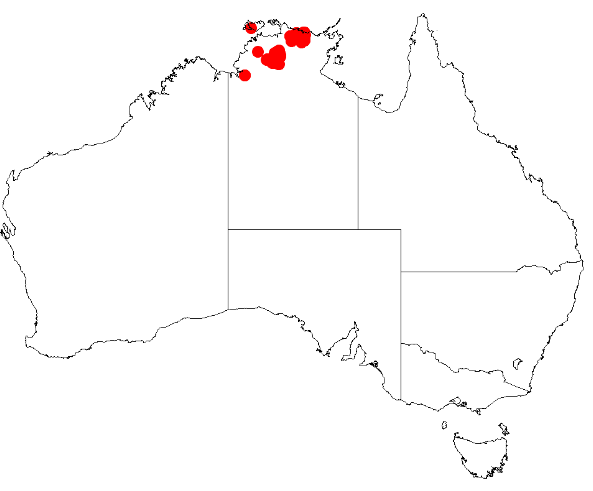
- Occurrence data from AVH

Synonyms
- Racosperma cataractae (Tindale & Kodela) Pedley

Species of legume

Acacia cataractae is a species of flowering plant in the family Fabaceae and is endemic to the Top End of the Northern Territory, Australia. It is a shrub with brown bark, lance-shaped to narrowly lance-shaped phyllodes with the narrower end towards the base, spikes of bright to golden yellow flowers, and crust-like woody pods up to 50 mm (2.0 in) long.

== Description ==
Acacia cataractae is a shrub that typically grows to a height of up to 2 m (6 ft 7 in) and has fibrous brown bark. Its branchlets are glabrous, angled to almost flattened near the ends. The phyllodes are lance-shaped to narrowly lance-shaped with the narrower end towards the base, 40–105 mm (1.6–4.1 in) long, 7.5–20 mm (0.30–0.79 in) wide, thinly leathery, flat and straight to slightly curved with three prominent longitudinal veins. The flowers are bright to golden yellow and arranged in one to three spikes 10–50 mm (0.39–1.97 in) long in upper axils on peduncles 4–12 mm (0.16–0.47 in) long. Flowering occurs from December to July and the pods are very narrowly lance-shaped with the narrower end towards the base, sometimes slightly curved, 26–50 mm (1.0–2.0 in) long, and glabrous with a hooked tip, containing glossy brown seeds 2.7–5.3 mm (0.11–0.21 in) long with a conical aril.

== Taxonomy ==
Acacia cataractae was first formally described in 1992 by Mary Tindale and Phillip Kodela in the journal Telopea from specimens collected near Gunlom Falls in 1975. The specific epithet (cataractae) refers to the falls, near where this species is locally abundant.

== Distribution and habitat ==
This species is endemic to the Top End of the Northern Territory, where it is usually found on sandy soil in sandstone country amongst rocks and boulders in woodland, in the Arnhem Coast, Arnhem Plateau, Daly Basin, Pine Creek, Tiwi Cobourg and Victoria Bonaparte bioregions.

== See also ==
- List of Acacia species
