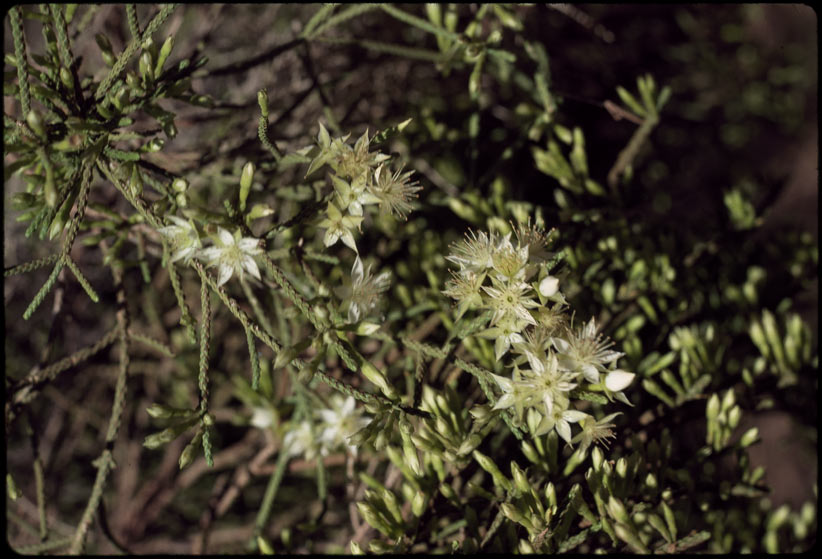
- Near Gunbalanya, Northern Territory

Scientific classification
- Kingdom: Plantae
- Clade: Tracheophytes
- Clade: Angiosperms
- Clade: Eudicots
- Clade: Rosids
- Order: Myrtales
- Family: Myrtaceae
- Genus: Calytrix
- Species: C. arborescens

Binomial name
- Calytrix arborescens (F.Muell.) Benth.

Synonyms
- Calycothrix arborescens F.Muell.; Calythrix arborescens Benth. orth. var.

= Calytrix arborescens =

Species of flowering plant

Calytrix arborescens is a species of flowering plant in the myrtle family Myrtaceae and is endemic to the Northern Territory. It is a shrub or tree with egg-shaped leaves and clusters of white flowers with 45 to 60 white stamens in 2 rows.

== Description ==
Calytrix arborescens is a shrub or tree that typically grows to a height of up to 7 m (23 ft), and has overlapping egg-shaped leaves, broadly triangular in cross-section, 1–2 mm (0.039–0.079 in) long, 0.75–1.0 mm (0.030–0.039 in) wide and sessile. There is a stipules up to 0.2 mm (0.0079 in) long at the base of the leaves. The flowers are arranged singly in leaf axils, the floral tube is a tapering cylinder with 10 ribs and 5–9 mm (0.20–0.35 in) long. The sepals are joined at the base, 3.5–5.0 mm (0.14–0.20 in) long and 1.5–2.0 mm (0.059–0.079 in) wide with a pointed awn. The petals are white, narrowly lance-shaped, 5.0–7.25 mm (0.197–0.285 in) long and 2.25–2.75 mm (0.089–0.108 in) wide and there are about 50 to 60 white stamens in 2 rows. Flowering occurs between June and October.

== Taxonomy ==
Calytrix arborescens was first formally described in 1859 by Ferdinand von Mueller who gave it the name Calycothrix arborescens in the Transactions of the Philosophical Institute of Victoria from specimens collected "in arid bushy plains" near the headwaters of the Roper and Limmen Bight Rivers. In 1867, George Bentham transferred the species to Calytrix as C. arborescens in his Flora Australiensis. The specific epithet (arborescens) means "becoming tree-like".

== Distribution and habitat ==
This starflower grows on white sand on sandy alluvial flats and in woodland and heathy scrub on sandstone in the Arnhem Coast, Arnhem Plateau, Daly Basin, Darwin Coastal, Gulf Fall and Uplands, Pine Creek and Tiwi Cobourg bioregions in the north of the Northern Territory.
