= Acacia mimula =

Conservation status
- Least Concern (TPWCA)

Scientific classification
- Kingdom: Plantae
- Clade: Tracheophytes
- Clade: Angiosperms
- Clade: Eudicots
- Clade: Rosids
- Order: Fabales
- Family: Fabaceae
- Subfamily: Caesalpinioideae
- Clade: Mimosoid clade
- Genus: Acacia
- Species: A. mimula

Binomial name
- Acacia mimula Pedley
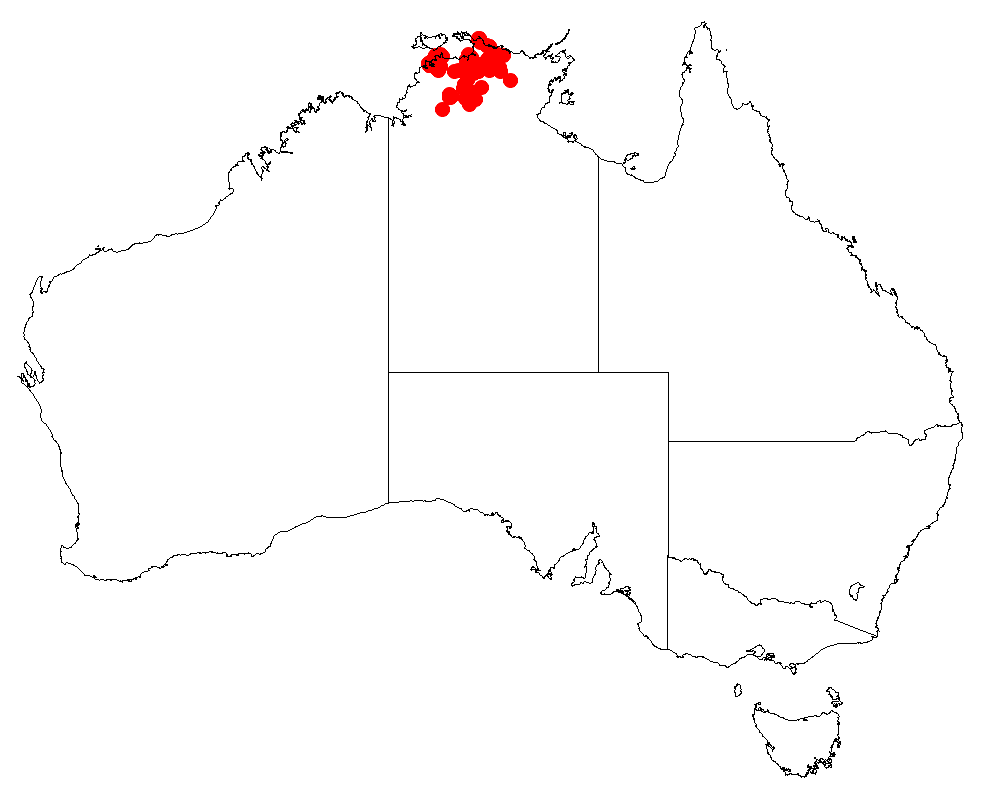
- Occurrence data from AVH

Synonyms
- Acacia propinqua Pedley nom. illeg.; Racosperma mimulum (Pedley) Pedley

Species of legume

Habit near the entrance to Kakadu National Park

Acacia mimula is a species of flowering plant in the family Fabaceae, and is endemic to the Top End of the Northern Territory, Australia. It is a shrub or tree with narrowly elliptic to lance-shaped and sickle-shaped phyllodes, spherical heads of white to cream-coloured or yellow flowers arranged in racemes, and flat, thickly leathery to woody pods.

== Description ==
Acacia mimula is a shrub or tree that typically grows to a height of 2–7 m (6 ft 7 in – 23 ft 0 in), and often forms suckers after fire. Its bark is dark grey with horizontal fissures and its branchlets are glabrous and flattened at the outer end. The phyllodes are narrowly eliptic to lance-shaped with the narrower end towards the base, 80–200 mm (3.1–7.9 in) long, 10–28 mm (0.39–1.10 in) wide and more or less strongly sickle-shaped with two or three prominent longitudinal veins, the pulvinus 3–4 mm (0.12–0.16 in) long. The are four to five glands scattered along the dorsal margin of the phyllodes. The flowers are arranged in 9 to 24 spherical heads in racemes 65–150 mm (2.6–5.9 in) long in axils or in panicles on the ends of branches, on peduncles 5–20 mm (0.20–0.79 in) long. Each head is 5–6 mm (0.20–0.24 in) in diameter with 40 to 62 white to cream-coloured or yellow flowers. Flowering occurs from April to June, and the pods are flat, up to 130 mm (5.1 in) long, 20–28 mm (0.79–1.10 in) wide, glabrous and thickly leathery to woody. The seeds are oblong, 9–10 mm (0.35–0.39 in) long, slightly shiny dark brown with an aril.

== Taxonomy ==
In 1974, Leslie Pedley first formally described this species in Contributions from the Queensland Herbarium, from specimens collected 27 mi (43 km) south-east of Darwin, and gave it the name Acacia propinqua, but that name was illegitimate, "being a later homonym of A. propinqua A. Richard". In 1977, Pedley changed the name to A. mimula in the journal Austrobaileya.

== Distribution and habitat ==
Acacia mimula grows in sandy and gravelly soil in forest and woodland from near Darwin and south-east to near Katherine in the Arnhem Coast, Arnhem Plateau, Central Arnhem, Daly Basin, Darwin Coastal, Pine Creek and Victoria Bonaparte bioregions of the Northern Territory.

== See also ==
- List of Acacia species
