= Jacksonia reclinata =

Scientific classification
- Kingdom: Plantae
- Clade: Tracheophytes
- Clade: Angiosperms
- Clade: Eudicots
- Clade: Rosids
- Order: Fabales
- Family: Fabaceae
- Subfamily: Faboideae
- Genus: Jacksonia
- Species: J. reclinata

Binomial name
- Jacksonia reclinata Chappill

Species of legume

Jacksonia reclinata is a species of flowering plant in the family Fabaceae and is endemic to the Northern Territory. It is a spreading to prostrate, spindly shrub with yellowish-green branches, the end branches sharply-pointed phylloclades, leaves reduced to reddish-brown, egg-shaped or narrowly egg-shaped scales, lemon-yellow flowers, and membranous, densely hairy, elliptic pods.

== Description ==
Jacksonia reclinata is a spreading to prostrate, spindly shrub that typically grows up to 0.2–1 m (7.9 in – 3 ft 3.4 in) high and 0.3–1.2 m (1 ft 0 in – 3 ft 11 in) wide. It has yellowish-green branches, the end branches sharply-pointed phylloclades, its leaves reduced to narrowly egg-shaped or egg-shaped, reddish-brown scales, 1.5–2.3 mm (0.059–0.091 in) long and 0.5–1 mm (0.020–0.039 in) wide with toothed edges. The flowers are scattered near the ends of phylloclades on a pedicel 3.1–4 mm (0.12–0.16 in) long, with lance-shaped bracteoles 1.7–2.7 mm (0.067–0.106 in) long, 0.3–0.8 mm (0.012–0.031 in) wide with toothed edges. The floral tube is 0.4–1 mm (0.016–0.039 in) long and not ribbed, and the sepals are membranous, with lobes 6.3–7.5 mm (0.25–0.30 in) long, 2.5–3.0 mm (0.098–0.118 in) wide and fused for 0.3–0.4 mm (0.012–0.016 in). The flowers are lemon-yellow, the standard petal 4.5–5.0 mm (0.18–0.20 in) long and 5–7 mm (0.20–0.28 in) deep, the wings 3.7–5.3 mm (0.15–0.21 in) long, and the keel is yellowish-green, 4.3–5.0 mm (0.17–0.20 in) long. The stamens have green filaments, 2.5–6 mm (0.098–0.236 in) long. Flowering occurs from January to September, and the fruit is an elliptic, membranous, densely hairy pod 3.5–3.6 mm (0.14–0.14 in) long and 3.0–3.1 mm (0.12–0.12 in) wide.

== Taxonomy ==
Jacksonia reclinata was first formally described in 2007 by Jennifer Anne Chappill in Australian Systematic Botany from specimens collected by Lyndley Craven 6 km (3.7 mi) east-south-east of Twin Fallsin 1980. The specific epithet (reclinata) means 'leading back' or 'reclining'.

== Distribution and habitat ==
This species of Jacksonia grows in shrubland or woodland on sandstone escarpments in Kakadu National Park and Arnhem Land in the Arnhem Coast, Arnhem Plateau, Central Arnhem, Darwin Coastal, Pine Creek and Victoria Bonaparte bioregions of the Northern Territory.

== Conservation status ==
Jacksonia reclinata is listed as of "least concern" under the Northern Territory Territory Parks and Wildlife Conservation Act.
