= Dodonaea oxyptera =

Conservation status
- Priority Two — Poorly Known Taxa (DEC)

Scientific classification
- Kingdom: Plantae
- Clade: Tracheophytes
- Clade: Angiosperms
- Clade: Eudicots
- Clade: Rosids
- Order: Sapindales
- Family: Sapindaceae
- Genus: Dodonaea
- Species: D. oxyptera

Binomial name
- Dodonaea oxyptera F.Muell.

Species of shrub

Dodonaea oxyptera is a species of plant in the family Sapindaceae and is endemic to northern Australia. It is usually a dioecious, spreading shrub with paripinnate leaves usually with 4 to 8 oblong to lance-shaped to egg-shaped leaflets with the narrower end towards the base, flowers arranged singly or in pairs, the flowers usually with four sepals and six to eight stamens, and capsules with 4 wings.

== Description ==
Dodonaea oxyptera is a dioecious or rarely a polygamo-dioecious, spreading shrub that typically grows to a height of up to 2 m (6 ft 7 in). Its leaves are paripinnate, 3–30 mm (0.12–1.18 in) long on a petiole 3.5–7 mm (0.14–0.28 in) long, usually with between 4 and 12 oblong to lance-shaped or egg-shaped leaflets with the narrower end towards the base, mostly 5.5–11 mm (0.22–0.43 in) long, 1.5–4 mm (0.059–0.157 in) wide and covered with soft hairs. The flowers are arranged singly or in pairs, each flower on a pedicel 1.5–2.5 mm (0.059–0.098 in) long, with four egg-shaped to lance-shaped sepals, 1.6–2 mm (0.063–0.079 in) long and six to eight stamens. The ovary is densely covered with soft hairs. Flowering occurs from March to July, and the fruit is a four-winged, leathery, egg-shaped capsule 5.5–8 mm (0.22–0.31 in) long and 9–10.5 mm (0.35–0.41 in) wide.

== Taxonomy ==
Dodonaea oxyptera was first formally described in 1831 by Ferdinand von Mueller in Hooker's Journal of Botany and Kew Garden Miscellany. The specific epithet (oxyptera) means 'sharp winged'.

== Distribution and habitat ==
This species of Dodonaea grows on stony ridges in woodland in the Northern Kimberley and Victoria Bonaparte bioregions of Western Australia and is widespread in the Arnhem Coast, Arnhem Plateau, Central Arnhem, Central Kimberley, Daly Basin, Gulf Coastal, Gulf Fall and Uplands, Gulf Plains, Mount Isa Inlier, Pine Creek, Sturt Plateau and Victoria Bonaparte bioregion of the Northern Territory and in north Queensland.

== Conservation status ==
Dodonaea oxyptera is listed as "Priority Two" by the Government of Western Australia Department of Biodiversity, Conservation and Attractions, meaning that it is poorly known and from one or a few locations.
