= Acacia yirrkallensis =

Conservation status
- Least Concern (TPWCA)

Scientific classification
- Kingdom: Plantae
- Clade: Tracheophytes
- Clade: Angiosperms
- Clade: Eudicots
- Clade: Rosids
- Order: Fabales
- Family: Fabaceae
- Subfamily: Caesalpinioideae
- Clade: Mimosoid clade
- Genus: Acacia
- Species: A. yirrkallensis

Binomial name
- Acacia yirrkallensis Specht
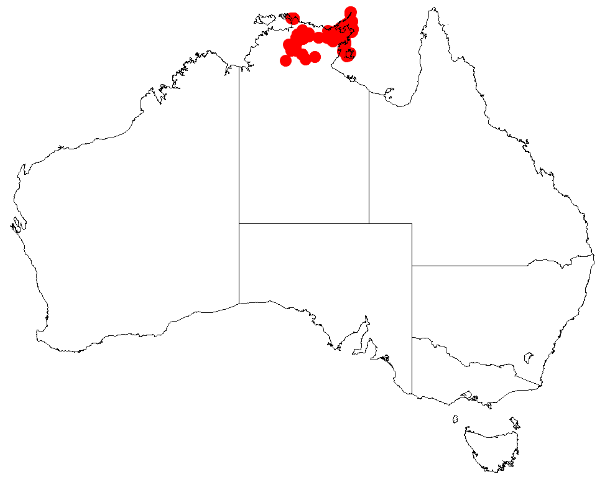
- Occurrence data from AVH

Synonyms
- Racosperma yirrkallense (Specht) Pedley

Species of legume

Acacia yirrkallensis is a shrub of the genus Acacia and the subgenus Plurinerves. It is native to the top end of the Northern Territory.

== Description ==
A. yirrkallensis is a resinous shrub to growing from 1 m to 2 m high. It can be erect or be lying flat on the ground and it branches near the ground. The bark is smooth, and a dark grey to dark brown. The smooth, brown/dark red-brown/yellowish branchlets are angular and have ridges which have minute resin crenulations. The straight to slightly curved, leathery phyllodes are very narrowly elliptic, and 1.5–4.5 cm by 1.4–5.2 mm, and have prominent stomata, with 1 or more prominent veins and indistinct parallel minor veins. Its globular yellow heads are 3–4.5 mm in diameter, with 10–13 flowers per head. The flowers are 5-merous and have a smooth, almost free calyx which is 0.9–1.1 mm long. The smooth corolla is 1.4–1.6 mm long. The woody, straight-sided, flat pods are oblanceolate, narrowing toward the base and 2–5 cm by 4–9 mm, and have oblique striations. Both the margins and the seed-partitions are prominent. The brown to dark brown seeds are 2.5–3.5 mm long. The stalk of the ovule expands to give a top-shaped aril.

It flowers from June to January, and fruits from February to October.

== Habitat ==
It usually grows in eucalypt forest and woodland on grey sandy podsols, on laterite and bauxite on stony sandstone ridges and gorges.

== Distribution ==
It is found in the Bioregions of Arnhem Coast, Arnhem Plateau, Central Arnhem, Gulf Fall and Uplands, Pine Creek, and Tiwi Cobourg.

== See also ==
- List of Acacia species
