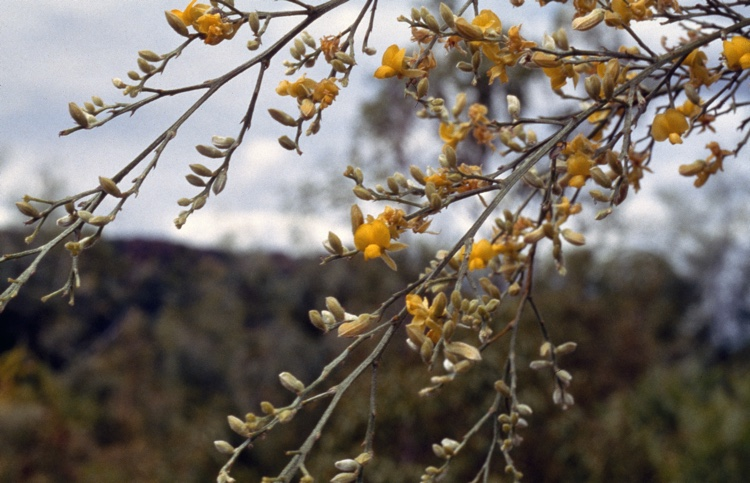
- Near the type location

Scientific classification
- Kingdom: Plantae
- Clade: Tracheophytes
- Clade: Angiosperms
- Clade: Eudicots
- Clade: Rosids
- Order: Fabales
- Family: Fabaceae
- Subfamily: Faboideae
- Genus: Jacksonia
- Species: J. pendens

Binomial name
- Jacksonia pendens Chappill

= Jacksonia pendens =

Species of legume

Jacksonia pendens is a species of flowering plant in the family Fabaceae and is endemic to the north of the Northern Territory. It is an erect, densely branching shrub, the end branches sharply-pointed phylloclades, the leaves reduced to narrowly egg-shaped scale leaves, the flowers yellow-orange, and the fruit a woody, densely hairy pod.

== Description ==
Jacksonia pendens is an erect, densely branched shrub that typically grows up to 1.2–4 m (3 ft 11 in – 13 ft 1 in) high and 1–2 m (3 ft 3 in – 6 ft 7 in) wide, its branches green or greyish-green, the end branches densely-hairy, sharply-pointed phylloclades. Its leaves are reduced to egg-shaped or narrowly egg-shaped, sharply-pointed, dark brown scales, 0.5–1.5 mm (0.020–0.059 in) long, 0.35–1.0 mm (0.014–0.039 in) wide. The flowers are arranged near the tips of the branches, each flower on a pedicel 1.6–2.3 mm (0.063–0.091 in) long. There are egg-shaped bracteoles 0.7–1.2 mm (0.028–0.047 in) long and 0.4–0.6 mm (0.016–0.024 in) wide on the pedicels. The floral tube is 1.1–1.4 mm (0.043–0.055 in) long and ribbed. The sepals are membranous, the lobes 1.7–2.3 mm (0.067–0.091 in) long and 1.4–1.7 mm (0.055–0.067 in) wide and fused at the base for 3.2–3.7 mm (0.13–0.15 in). The petals are yellow-orange, the standard petal 4.7–5.4 mm (0.19–0.21 in) long and 5–7 mm (0.20–0.28 in) deep, the wings 4.0–4.7 mm (0.16–0.19 in) long, and the keel 4.0–4.7 mm (0.16–0.19 in) long. The stamens have green filaments 3.1–5.3 mm (0.12–0.21 in) long. Flowering occurs from April to October, and the fruit is a woody, elliptic pod, 4.3–5.5 mm (0.17–0.22 in) long, 2.3–2.5 mm (0.091–0.098 in) wide and densely covered with white hairs.

== Taxonomy ==
Jacksonia pendens was first formally described in 2007 by Jennifer Anne Chappill in Australian Systematic Botany from specimens collected 14.9 km (9.3 mi) from Pine Creek Road in 1992. The specific epithet (pendens) means 'hanging down'.

== Distribution and habitat ==
This species of Jacksonia grows in woodland over laterite or sandstone in the Arnhem Plateau, Darwin Coastal and Pine Creek bioregions in the north of the Northern Territory.

== Conservation status ==
Jacksonia pendens is listed as of "least concern" under the Territory Parks and Wildlife Conservation Act.
