= Ptilotus rotundatus =

Scientific classification
- Kingdom: Plantae
- Clade: Embryophytes
- Clade: Tracheophytes
- Clade: Spermatophytes
- Clade: Angiosperms
- Clade: Eudicots
- Order: Caryophyllales
- Family: Amaranthaceae
- Genus: Ptilotus
- Species: P. rotundatus

Binomial name
- Ptilotus rotundatus Benl

Species of plant

Ptilotus rotundatus is a species of flowering plant of the family Amaranthaceae and is endemic to the Top End of the Northern Territory, Australia. It is an annual herb with linear to lance-shaped stem leaves, up to 40 spikes of whitish flowers and spherical, reddish brown seeds.

== Description ==
Ptilotus rotundatus is an annual herb that typically grows to a height of 35–50 cm (14–20 in), its stems, branches and foliage covered with whitish, rough, curved, soft hairs. The stem leaves are arranged alternately, linear to lance-shaped tapering on both ends, 40–50 mm (1.6–2.0 in) long and up to 1.2 mm (0.047 in) wide, with a prominent midrib on the lower surface. The flowers are borne in up to 40 oval to conical spikes up to 20 mm (0.79 in) long and 5 mm (0.20 in) wide with up to 30 to 40 whitish flowers on the ends of branches. The many oblong to egg-shaped bracts are mostly 1.3–1.5 mm (0.051–0.059 in) long and 0.8–1.0 mm (0.031–0.039 in) wide and the bracteoles 0.8–1.0 mm (0.031–0.039 in) long and 0.8–0.9 mm (0.031–0.035 in) wide. The outer tepals are 1.6–1.8 mm (0.063–0.071 in) long, and there are five stamens. The style is straight, about 0.25 mm (0.0098 in) long and the ovary is conical, 0.7 mm (0.028 in) long and 0.6 mm (0.024 in) wide. The seeds are spherical amd reddish brown.

== Taxonomy ==
Ptilotus rotundatus was first formally described in 1984 by Gerhard Benl in the journal Muelleria from specimens collected near Boggy Plain Creek near Jabiru in 1973. The specific epithet (rotundatus) means 'rotund', referring to the outer tepals.

== Distribution and habitat ==
This species of Ptilotus is only known from the Arnhem Plateau, Darwin Coastal and Pine Creek bioregions in the Top End of the Northern Territory.

== Conservation status ==
Ptilotus rotundatus is listed as data deficient under the Territory Parks and Wildlife Conservation Act.
