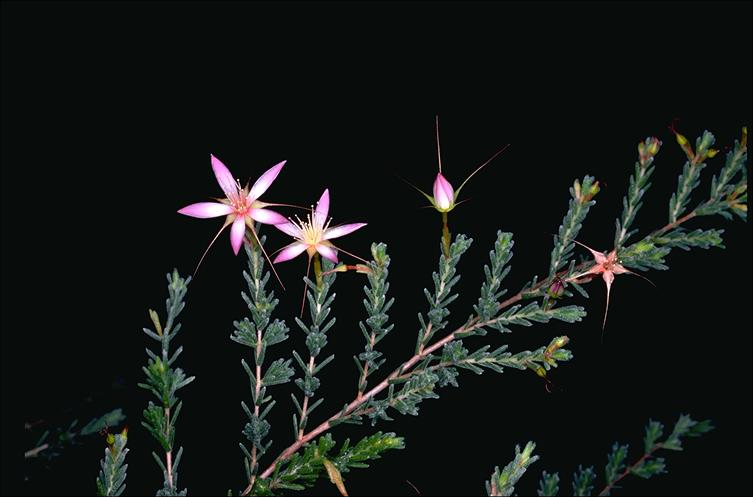
- In the Australian National Botanic Gardens

Scientific classification
- Kingdom: Plantae
- Clade: Tracheophytes
- Clade: Angiosperms
- Clade: Eudicots
- Clade: Rosids
- Order: Myrtales
- Family: Myrtaceae
- Genus: Calytrix
- Species: C. decussata

Binomial name
- Calytrix decussata Craven

= Calytrix decussata =

Species of flowering plant

Calytrix decussata is a species of flowering plant in the myrtle family Myrtaceae and is endemic to the Northern Territory. It is a shrub with linear to lance-shaped leaves and pinkish-mauve flowers arranged singly or in scatter groups with about 45 to 50 white stamens that become reddish-purple as the flower ages.

== Description ==
Calytrix decussata is a shrub that typically grows to a height of up to 1.5 m (4 ft 11 in). Its leaves are decussate, linear to lance-shaped and covered with matted hairs, 1.5–4 mm (0.059–0.157 in) long, 0.25–0.75 mm (0.0098–0.0295 in) wide and sessile. There is a stipule up to 0.1 mm (0.0039 in) long at the base of the leaves. The flowers are arranged singly or in small groups scattered along the branches. The floral tube has 10 ribs and is 7–9 mm (0.28–0.35 in) long. The sepals are joined at the base, with more or less round to egg-shaped lobes, 1.5–2.0 mm (0.059–0.079 in) long and 1.5–2.5 mm (0.059–0.098 in) wide with an awn up to 12 mm (0.47 in) long. The petals are pinkish-mauve at first, and white at the base, elliptic, 5.0–6.5 mm (0.20–0.26 in) long and 1.5–3.0 mm (0.059–0.118 in) wide, later becoming deep purplish-mauve. There are about 40 to 50 white stamens in 2 rows, that become reddish purple as the flower ages.

== Taxonomy ==
Calytrix decussata was first formally described in 1987 by Lyndley Craven in the journal Brunonia from specimens collected near the UDP Falls in 1973. The specific epithet (decussata) means 'decussate'.

== Distribution and habitat ==
This starflower grows on shallow sand over sandstone in heathy scrub, spinifex and woodland, in the Arnhem Plateau and Pine Creek bioregions in the north of the Northern Territory.
