= Acacia megalantha =

Scientific classification
- Kingdom: Plantae
- Clade: Tracheophytes
- Clade: Angiosperms
- Clade: Eudicots
- Clade: Rosids
- Order: Fabales
- Family: Fabaceae
- Subfamily: Caesalpinioideae
- Clade: Mimosoid clade
- Genus: Acacia
- Species: A. megalantha

Binomial name
- Acacia megalantha F.Muell.
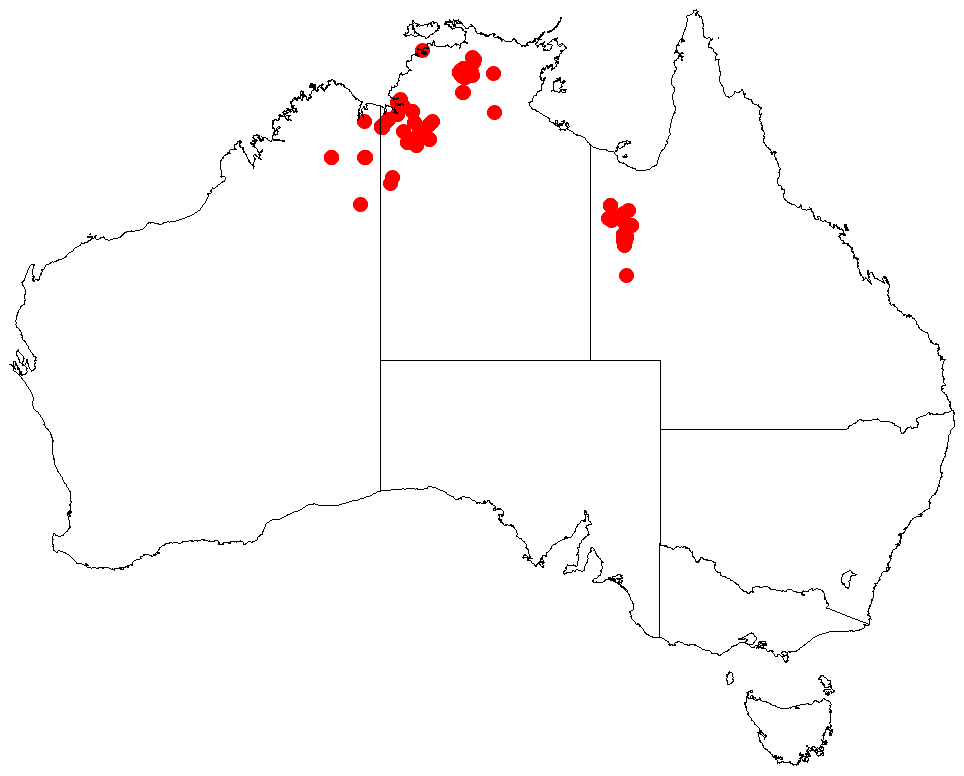
- Occurrence data from AVH

Synonyms
- Racosperma megalanthum (F.Muell.) Pedley

Species of legume

Acacia megalantha is a species of flowering plant in the family Fabaceae and is endemic to northern Australia. It is a resinous shrub with smooth grey bark, orange-brown branchlets, narrowly elliptic or elliptic, leathery phyllodes, spikes of golden yellow flowers, and woody pods.

== Description ==
Acacia megalantha is a resinous shrub that typically grows to a height of up to 4 m (13 ft) and has more or less smooth grey bark and orange-brown branchlets more or less flattened towards the end. Its phyllodes are narrowly elliptic or elliptic 50–110 mm (2.0–4.3 in) long, 14–28 mm (0.55–1.10 in) wide, leathery, rigid and with mostly three prominent longitudinal veins, and four to six minor veins per millimetre (per 0.03937 in). The flowers are golden yellow and borne in spikes 14–35 mm (0.55–1.38 in) long. Flowering occurs from April to September, and the pods are flat, more or less straight sided, straight to curved, 30–100 mm (1.2–3.9 in) long, 7.5–11 mm (0.30–0.43 in) wide, woodly and glabrous with thick, pale margins. The seeds are round to broadly elliptic, 4.8–6.2 mm (0.19–0.24 in) long and light brown.

== Taxonomy ==
Acacia megalantha was first formally described in 1859 by the Ferdinand von Mueller in the Journal of the Proceedings of the Linnean Society, Botany from specimens collected near Sturt's Creek in the Northern Territory. The specific epithet (megalantha) means 'large-flowered'.

== Distribution and habitat ==
This species of wattle grows on sandstone, in shallow soil on rocky hillsides and on plateaus in woodland in the Central Kimberley, Ord Victoria Plain, Tanami, Victoria Bonaparte, Arnhem Plateau, Mount Isa Inlierand Pine Creek bioregions of Western Australia and the Northern Territory, and near Mount Isa in Queensland.

== See also ==
- List of Acacia species
