= Calytrix verticillata =

Conservation status
- Priority Three — Poorly Known Taxa (DEC)

Scientific classification
- Kingdom: Plantae
- Clade: Tracheophytes
- Clade: Angiosperms
- Clade: Eudicots
- Clade: Rosids
- Order: Myrtales
- Family: Myrtaceae
- Genus: Calytrix
- Species: C. verticillata

Binomial name
- Calytrix verticillata Craven

Species of flowering plant

Calytrix verticillata is a species of flowering plant in the myrtle family Myrtaceae and is endemic to the north of the Northern Territory. It is a shrub with linear or lance-shaped leaves and white flowers with about 18 to 20 stamens in a single row.

== Description ==
Calytrix verticillata is a shrub that typically grows to a height of 1.5 m (4 ft 11 in) and has branchlets covered with soft hairs. It usually grows from the tips of the flowering stems. Its leaves are linear to lance-shaped, 1.5–4 mm (0.059–0.157 in) long and 0.5–0.75 mm (0.020–0.030 in) wide on a petiole 0.1–0.3 mm (0.0039–0.0118 in) long, with stipules up to 0.25 mm (0.0098 in) long at the base of the petiole. The flowers are on a peduncle 0.2–0.5 mm (0.0079–0.0197 in) long, the floral tube is more or less spindle-shaped or cylindrical, 3.0–3.5 mm (0.12–0.14 in) long and has ten ribs. The sepals are lance-shaped, 3–4 mm (0.12–0.16 in) long, 1.0–1.25 mm (0.039–0.049 in) wide and lack an awn but with a pointed tip. The petals are white, elliptic to lance-shaped, 2.5–4 mm (0.098–0.157 in) long and 1.0–1.3 mm (0.039–0.051 in) wide, and there are about 18 to 20 stamens in a single row, the filaments white and 0.2–3 mm (0.0079–0.1181 in) long. Flowering occurs from June to October and the seed is 1.75 mm (0.069 in) long and 1 mm (0.039 in) wide.

== Taxonomy ==
Calytrix verticillata was first formally described in 1987 by the botanist Lyndley Craven in the journal Brunonia from specimens he collected 30 km (19 mi) west of Katherine in 1977.

== Distribution and habitat ==
This species of Calytrix is found in the Katherine district on sandstone in spinifex woodland and on lateritic slopes in the Daly Basin, Darwin Coastal, Gulf Fall and Uplands and Pine Creek bioregions of the Northern Territory.

== Conservation status ==
Calytrix verticillata is listed as of "least concern" under the Territory Parks and Wildlife Conservation Act.
