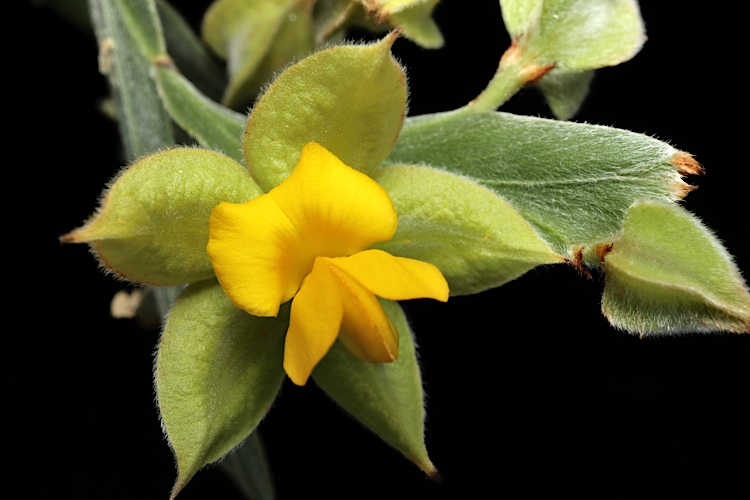
- In the ANBG

Scientific classification
- Kingdom: Plantae
- Clade: Tracheophytes
- Clade: Angiosperms
- Clade: Eudicots
- Clade: Rosids
- Order: Fabales
- Family: Fabaceae
- Subfamily: Faboideae
- Genus: Jacksonia
- Species: J. stellaris

Binomial name
- Jacksonia stellaris Chappill

= Jacksonia stellaris =

Species of legume

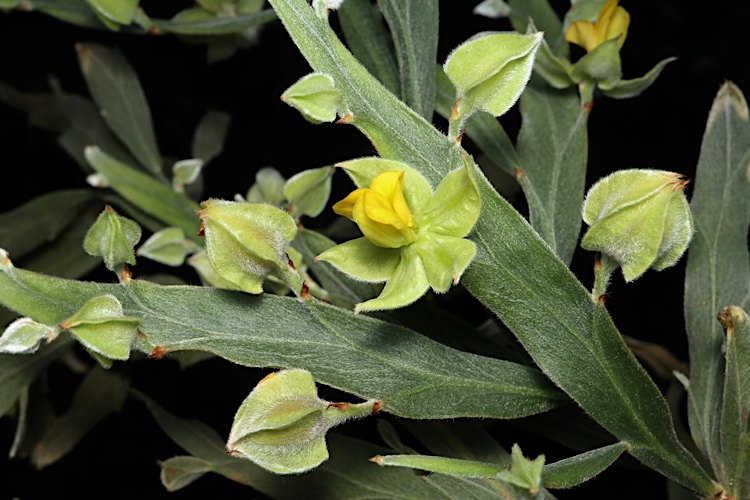
Flower buds, showing arrangement on cladodes

Jacksonia stellaris is a species of flowering plant in the family Fabaceae and is endemic to the north of the Northern Territory. It is an erect, densely-branched shrub with greyish-green branches with a winged appearance, the end branches cladodes, the leaves reduced to reddish-brown, egg-shaped scales, yellow-orange flowers arranged singly on the edges of the cladodes, and membranous, densely hairy, elliptic pods.

== Description ==
Jacksonia stellaris is an erect, densely-branched shrub that typically grows up to 0.3–2.5 m (1 ft 0 in – 8 ft 2 in) high and 0.5–1.5 m (1 ft 8 in – 4 ft 11 in) wide. It has greyish-green branches, the end branches winged cladodes, its leaves reduced to egg-shaped, reddish-brown scales, 1.7–2.8 mm (0.067–0.110 in) long and 1.1–2.5 mm (0.043–0.098 in) wide. The flowers are arranged singly on the sides of cladodes on a pedicel 2–5 mm (0.079–0.197 in) long, with cream-coloured, oval bracts 12–18.6 mm (0.47–0.73 in) long, 8–10 mm (0.31–0.39 in) wide and egg-shaped bracteoles 2.3–4.5 mm (0.091–0.177 in) long and 2.0–2.3 mm (0.079–0.091 in) wide. The floral tube is 1.0–1.3 mm (0.039–0.051 in) long and not ribbed, and the sepals are papery, with lobes 11–17 mm (0.43–0.67 in) long, 7–10.7 mm (0.28–0.42 in) wide and fused for 3.3–5.2 mm (0.13–0.20 in). The standard petal is yellow-orange, 6.8–7.7 mm (0.27–0.30 in) long and 8–11 mm (0.31–0.43 in) deep, the wings yellow-orange, 7.9–8.5 mm (0.31–0.33 in) long, and the keel is greenish-yellow, 7.5–7.7 mm (0.30–0.30 in) long. The stamens have green filaments, 5.0–8.5 mm (0.20–0.33 in) long. Flowering occurs from February to October, and the fruit is an elliptic, membranous, densely hairy pod 4.5–6.0 mm (0.18–0.24 in) long and 3.7–5 mm (0.15–0.20 in) wide.

== Taxonomy ==
Jacksonia stellaris was first formally described in 2007 by Jennifer Anne Chappill in Australian Systematic Botany from specimens collected on the escarpment above Waterfall Creek Falls in 1992.

== Distribution and habitat ==
This species of Jacksonia grows in woodland on rocky slopes or plateaux in Kakadu and Arnhem Land in the Arnhem Plateau and Pine Creek bioregions in the north of the Northern Territory.

== Conservation status ==
Jacksonia stellaris is listed as of "least concern" under the Northern Territory Territory Parks and Wildlife Conservation Act.
