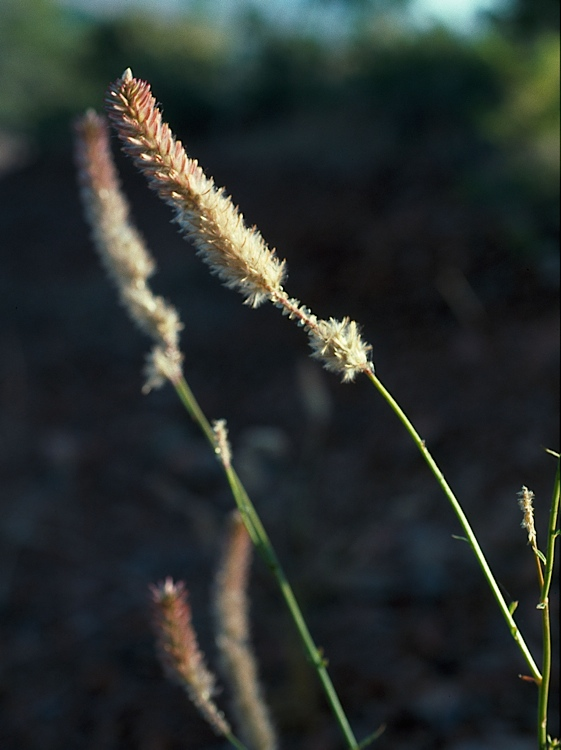

Scientific classification
- Kingdom: Plantae
- Clade: Tracheophytes
- Clade: Angiosperms
- Clade: Eudicots
- Order: Caryophyllales
- Family: Amaranthaceae
- Genus: Ptilotus
- Species: P. giganteus

Binomial name
- Ptilotus giganteus (A.Cunn. ex Moq.) R.W.Davis & R.Butcher

Synonyms
- List: Ptilotus alopecuroideus var. longistachyus (W.Fitzg.) Benl; Ptilotus longistachyus W.Fitzg.; Ptilotus polystachyus var. longistachyus (W.Fitzg.) Benl; Ptilotus polystachyus var. pullenii (Benl) Benl; Ptilotus pullenii Benl; Trichinium giganteum A.Cunn. ex Moq.; Trichinium longistachyum (W.Fitzg.) C.A.Gardner

= Ptilotus giganteus =

Species of grass-like plant

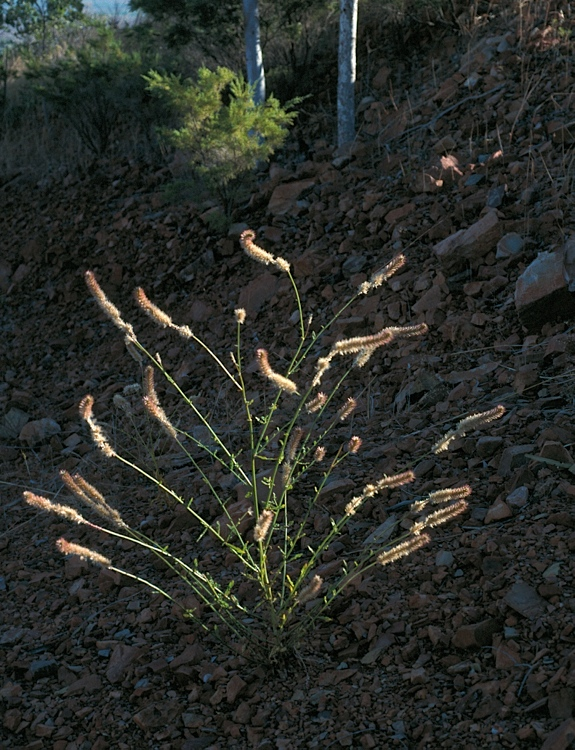
Habit near Wyndham

Ptilotus giganteus is a species of flowering plant in the family Amaranthaceae and is endemic to the north-west of Australia. It is an erect annual herb, with lance-shaped leaves with the narrower end towards the base, and cylindrical green spikes of flowers.

== Description ==
Ptilotus giganteus is an erect annual herb, that typically grows to a height of up to 1 m (3 ft 3 in), its stems ribbed with a sparse covering of simple hairs. The leaves on the stems are arranged alternately, lance-shaped with the narrower end towards the base, 10–80 mm (0.39–3.15 in) long and 3–12 mm (0.12–0.47 in) wide. The flowers are arranged in cylindrical spikes 20–180 mm (0.79–7.09 in) long and 20–27 mm (0.79–1.06 in) wide, with narrowly egg-shaped, translucent bracts 2.0–3.8 mm (0.079–0.150 in) long, and broadly egg-shaped, straw-coloured bracteoles 2.8–4.4 mm (0.11–0.17 in) long and glabrous. The tepals are mostly 8–11 mm (0.31–0.43 in) long and there are 4 stamens and a single staminode, the style is 4.5–10.5 mm (0.18–0.41 in) long and straight, fixed to the centre of the ovary. Flowering occurs from March to September.

== Taxonomy ==
This species was first formally described in 1849 by Alfred Moquin-Tandon who gave it the name Trichinium giganteum in de Candolle's Prodromus Systematis Naturalis Regni Vegetabilis from an unpublished description by Allan Cunningham. In 2010, Robert Wayne Davis and Ryonen Butcher transferred the species to Ptilotus as P. giganteus in the journal Nuytsia. The specific epithet (giganteus) means 'exceptionally large'.

== Distribution and habitat ==
Ptilotus giganteus grows on sandstone hills and plateaux in the Central Kimberley, Dampierland, Northern Kimberley, Ord Victoria Plain and Victoria Bonaparte bioregions of northern Western Australia and the Gulf Fall and Uplands, MacDonnell Ranges, Ord Victoria Plain, Pine Creek, Sturt Plateau and Victoria Bonaparte bioregions of the Northern Territory.

== See also ==
- List of Ptilotus species
