= Acacia brockii =

Scientific classification
- Kingdom: Plantae
- Clade: Tracheophytes
- Clade: Angiosperms
- Clade: Eudicots
- Clade: Rosids
- Order: Fabales
- Family: Fabaceae
- Subfamily: Caesalpinioideae
- Clade: Mimosoid clade
- Genus: Acacia
- Species: A. brockii

Binomial name
- Acacia brockii Tindale & Kodela
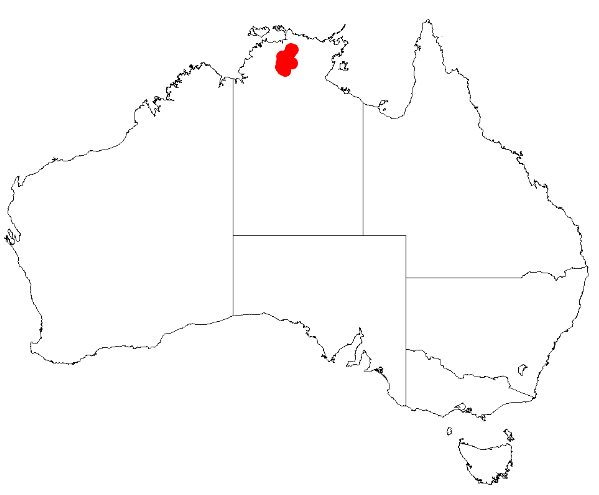
- Occurrence data from AVH

Synonyms
- Racosperma brockii (Tindale & Kodela) Pedley

Species of legume

Acacia brockii is a species of flowering plant in the family Fabaceae and is endemic to the Northern Territory. It is a tree with linear phyllodes tapered at both ends, spikes of lemon yellow flowers arranged singly or in pairs, and linear, papery pods.

== Description ==
Acacia brockii is a slender tree that typically grows to a height of 5 m (16 ft) with smooth, dark grey bark and silvery-grey young foliage that soon becomes glabrous. Its phyllodes are linear, flat, straight or slightly curved, 110–256 mm (4.3–10.1 in) long and 1.4–2.8 mm (0.055–0.110 in) wide and bright green with a gland at the base. The flowers are borne in one or two spikes in leaf axils on densely hairy peduncles 2–3 mm (0.079–0.118 in) long, each spike 23–43 mm (0.91–1.69 in) long and 3.5–4.5 mm (0.14–0.18 in) wide with pale yellow flowers. Flowering has been recorded in April and May, and the pods are linear, papery, 80–120 mm (3.1–4.7 in) long, 4.5–6 mm (0.18–0.24 in) wide, light brown and raised over the seeds.

This species is distinguished from other Northern Territory Acacias by the flattened hairs on its young phyllodes, its fringed bracteoles with sharp tips that extend beyond the flower buds, and by the fine, long, silvery hairs on its sepals.

== Taxonomy ==
Acacia brockii wad first formally described in 1992 by Mary Tindale and Phillip Kodela in the journal Telopea from specimens collected in Kakadu National Park by Andrew Slee and Lyndley Craven. The specific epithet, (brockii), honours John Brock, the Northern Territory author and botanical consultant who first collected this species.

== Distribution and habitat ==
This species of wattle is endemic to the Northern Territory where it grows in red kaolinitic soil in the Arnhem Plateau and Pine Creek bioregions in Kakadu and Nitmiluk National Parks.

== See also ==
- List of Acacia species
