= Acacia oligoneura =

Scientific classification
- Kingdom: Plantae
- Clade: Tracheophytes
- Clade: Angiosperms
- Clade: Eudicots
- Clade: Rosids
- Order: Fabales
- Family: Fabaceae
- Subfamily: Caesalpinioideae
- Clade: Mimosoid clade
- Genus: Acacia
- Species: A. oligoneura

Binomial name
- Acacia oligoneura F.Muell.
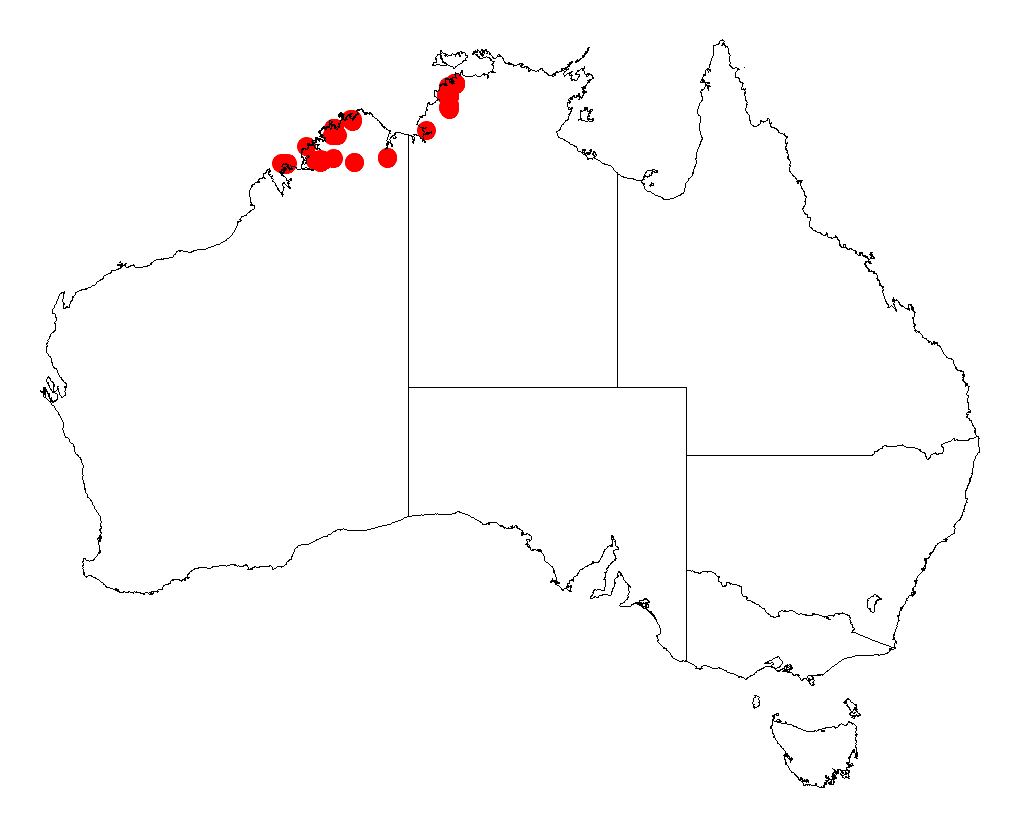
- Occurrence data from AVH

Synonyms
- Racosperma oligoneurum (F.Muell.) Pedley; Acacia oncinocarpa auct. non Benth.: Green, J.W. (1985)

Species of legume

Acacia oligoneura is a species of flowering plant in the family Fabaceae, and is endemic to north-western Australia. It is a many-stemmed, resinous shrub with angular branchlets with many scattered clear granules, very narrowly lance-shaped, thinly leathery phyllodes, spikes of light golden or bright yellow flowers and narrowly lance-shaped pods.

== Description ==
Acacia oligoneura is a many-stemmed, resinous shrub that typically grows to a height of 1–2 m (3 ft 3 in – 6 ft 7 in) with angular greenish yellow to pale brown, glabrous branchlets covered with many scattered reddish brown to clear granules. Its phyllodes are very narrowly lance-shaped with the narrower end towards the base, straight or slightly curved, mostly 100–160 mm (3.9–6.3 in) long, 8.5–16 mm (0.33–0.63 in) wide, papery to thinly leathery, light olive-green and glabrous. There are two to four longitudinal veins per millimetre and a gland up to 4 mm (0.16 in) above the pulvinus. The flowers are light golden or bright yellow, and borne in up to three spikes 10–42 mm (0.39–1.65 in) long in axils on peduncles 2.5–8 mm (0.098–0.315 in) long. Flowering occurs from January to May, and the pods are narrowly lance-shaped with the narrower end towards the base, 50–85 mm (2.0–3.3 in) long, 4–7.5 mm (0.16–0.30 in) wide, woody and glabrous. The seeds are more or less elliptic or oblong, 4.7–5.5 mm (0.19–0.22 in) long and mid-brown with a narrowly conical axil.

== Taxonomy ==
Acacia oligoneura was first formally described in 1859 by Ferdinand von Mueller in the Journal of the Proceedings of the Linnean Society, Botany from specimens collected in Arnhem Land.The specific epithet (oligoneura) mean 'few-nerved'.

== Distribution and habitat ==
This species of wattle grows in woodland in laterite or red clay over basalt on rocky slopes and occurs in Western Australia and from Noonamah to the Litchfield–Daly River area and the Victoria River area of the north-western Northern Territory in the Central Kimberley, Darwin Coastal, Northern Kimberley and Victoria Bonaparte bioregions.

== See also ==
- List of Acacia species
