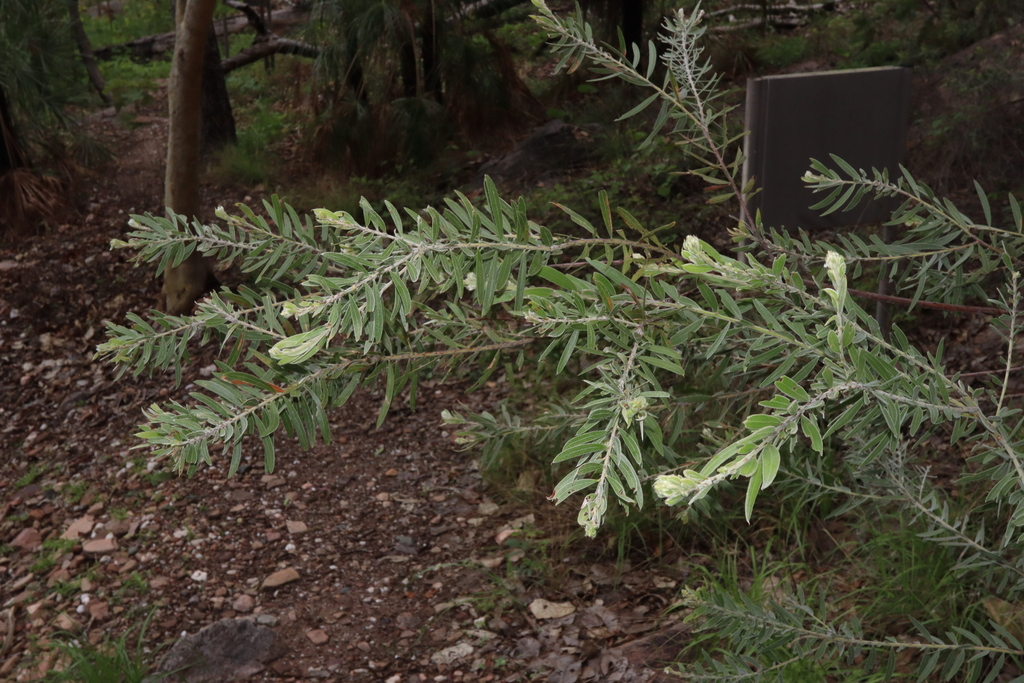
- In Kakadu National Park

Scientific classification
- Kingdom: Plantae
- Clade: Tracheophytes
- Clade: Angiosperms
- Clade: Eudicots
- Clade: Rosids
- Order: Fabales
- Family: Fabaceae
- Subfamily: Caesalpinioideae
- Clade: Mimosoid clade
- Genus: Acacia
- Species: A. multistipulosa

Binomial name
- Acacia multistipulosa Tindale & Bedward
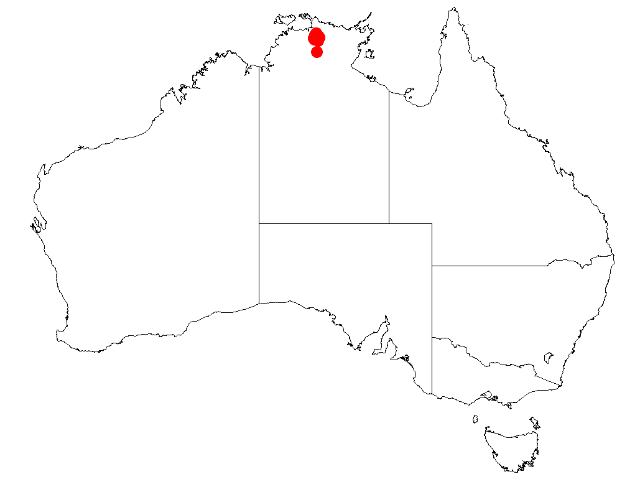
- Occurrence data from AVH

Synonyms
- Racosperma multistipulosum (Tindale & Bedward) Pedley

= Acacia multistipulosa =

Species of legume

Acacia multistipulosa is a species of flowering plant in the family Fabaceae, and is endemic to the Top End of the Northern Territory, Australia. It is an often spindly shrub or tree with smooth bark and branchlets covered with shaggy hairs, narrowly elliptic to narrowly lance-shaped phyllodes with very conspicuous stipules at the base, spikes of bright yellow flowers, and linear, flat and sometimes slightly twisted pods.

== Description ==
Acacia multistipulosa is an often spindly shrub or tree that typically grows to a height of up to 10 m (33 ft) with smooth, grey brown to black bark, fissured in older trees, and terete branchlets densely covered with shaggy hairs. Its phyllodes are narrowly elliptic to narrowly lance-shaped with the narrower end towards the base, straight to slightly curved, 35–105 mm (1.4–4.1 in) long, 4–8 mm (0.16–0.31 in) wide, leathery with many longitudinal veins, the mid vein more prominent than the rest, and a gland 5–10 mm (0.20–0.39 in) above the pulvinus. There are very conspicuous stipules 3–7 mm (0.12–0.28 in) long at the base of the phyllodes. The flowers are bright yellow, and borne in spikes 24–90 mm (0.94–3.54 in) long on peduncles 1–5 mm (0.039–0.197 in) long. Flowering occurs from March to June, and the pods are linear, more or less flat, sometimes slightly twisted, 35–80 mm (1.4–3.1 in) long, 4–7 mm (0.16–0.28 in) wide, covered with fine, soft hairs. The seeds are more or less elliptic, 3.6–4.9 mm (0.14–0.19 in) long, dark brownish black with a pale aril.

== Taxonomy ==
Acacia multistipulosa was first formally described in Australian Systematic Botany from specimens collected 50 m (160 ft) east of Bowerbird Hut, near Jabiru in Kakadu National Park in 1984.

== Distribution and habitat ==
This species of wattle is confined to an area within Kakadu National Park where it often grows on rocky ledges, usually amongst boulders, in sandy soils over sandstone in open Eucalyptus woodland with an understorey of spinifex in the Arnhem Plateau and Pine Creek bioregions.

== See also ==
- List of Acacia species
