= Jacksonia spicata =

Scientific classification
- Kingdom: Plantae
- Clade: Tracheophytes
- Clade: Angiosperms
- Clade: Eudicots
- Clade: Rosids
- Order: Fabales
- Family: Fabaceae
- Subfamily: Faboideae
- Genus: Jacksonia
- Species: J. spicata

Binomial name
- Jacksonia spicata Chappill

Species of legume

Jacksonia spicata is a species of flowering plant in the family Fabaceae and is endemic to the north of the Northern Territory. It is a spreading, densely-branched shrub with greyish-green branches, the leaves reduced to reddish-brown, egg-shaped scales, yellow-orange flowers arranged in spike-like clusters, and membranous, densely hairy, elliptic pods.

== Description ==
Jacksonia spicata is a spreading, densely-branched shrub that typically grows up to 0.3–1.5 m (1 ft 0 in – 4 ft 11 in) high and 0.6–1 m (2 ft 0 in – 3 ft 3 in) wide. It has greyish-green branches, its leaves reduced to egg-shaped, reddish-brown scales, 2.1–3.7 mm (0.083–0.146 in) long and 0.8–1.6 mm (0.031–0.063 in) wide. The flowers are arranged in spike-like clusters of three to eighteen near the ends of cladodes on a pedicel 1.5–2.3 mm (0.059–0.091 in) long, with egg-shaped bracteoles 3.7–4.5 mm (0.15–0.18 in) long, 1.3–1.6 mm (0.051–0.063 in) wide. The floral tube is 0.5–0.9 mm (0.020–0.035 in) long and not ribbed, and the sepals are papery, with lobes 8.0–9.3 mm (0.31–0.37 in) long, 2.9–4.1 mm (0.11–0.16 in) wide and fused for 0.3–0.5 mm (0.012–0.020 in). The flowers are yellow-orange, the standard petal 3.5–6.0 mm (0.14–0.24 in) long and 5–8 mm (0.20–0.31 in) deep, the wings 6.2–6.8 mm (0.24–0.27 in) long, and the keel 6.2–6.6 mm (0.24–0.26 in) long. The stamens have green filaments, 3.3–3.6 mm (0.13–0.14 in) long. Flowering occurs from January to September, and the fruit is an elliptic, membranous, densely hairy pod 3.8–4.8 mm (0.15–0.19 in) long and 3.1–3.9 mm (0.12–0.15 in) wide.

== Taxonomy ==
Jacksonia spicata was first formally described in 2007 by Jennifer Anne Chappill in Australian Systematic Botany from specimens collected 15 mi (24 km) east of Katherine in 1964.

== Distribution and habitat ==
This species of Jacksonia grows in woodland, shrubland or grassland on sandstone escarpments in Judbarra / Gregory, Kakadu and Nitmiluk National Parks in the Gulf Fall and Uplands, Ord Victoria Plain, Pine Creek and Victoria Bonaparte bioregions in the north of the Northern Territory.

== Conservation status ==
Jacksonia spicata is listed as of "least concern" under the Northern Territory Territory Parks and Wildlife Conservation Act.
