= Acacia multisiliqua =

Scientific classification
- Kingdom: Plantae
- Clade: Tracheophytes
- Clade: Angiosperms
- Clade: Eudicots
- Clade: Rosids
- Order: Fabales
- Family: Fabaceae
- Subfamily: Caesalpinioideae
- Clade: Mimosoid clade
- Genus: Acacia
- Species: A. multisiliqua

Binomial name
- Acacia multisiliqua (Benth.) Maconochie
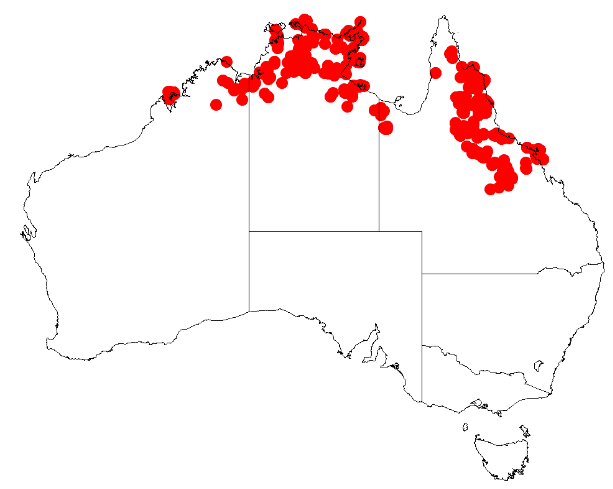
- Occurrence data from AVH

Synonyms
- Acacia simsii var. multisiliqua Benth.; Racosperma multisiliquum (Benth.) Pedley

Species of shrub or tree

Acacia multisiliqua is a species of flowering plant in the family Fabaceae, and is endemic to northern Australia. It is a spindly, glabrous shrub, sometimes a slender tree, with oblong to narrowly elliptic, leathery phyllodes, spherical heads of golden yellow flowers, and linear, leathery pods raised over and constricted between the seeds.

== Description ==
Acacia multisiliqua is a spindly, glabrous shrub that typically grows to a height of 1–3 m (3 ft 3 in – 9 ft 10 in), sometimes a slender tree to 5 m (16 ft) or prostrate in exposed coastal situations. Its branchlets are glabrous and its phyllodes are oblong to narrowly elliptic, commonly slightly curved, mostly 30–70 mm (1.2–2.8 in) long, 4–10 mm (0.16–0.39 in) wide and leathery, with up to three main veins and a gland 1–10 mm (0.039–0.394 in) above the pulvinus. The flowers are borne in one or two spherical heads in axils on peduncles 2–7 mm (0.079–0.276 in) long, each head 4–6 mm (0.16–0.24 in) in diameter with 25 to 40 golden yellow flowers. Flowering occurs in most months, and the pods are linear, up to 65 mm (2.6 in) long, 3–6 mm (0.12–0.24 in) wide and leathery, raised over and constricted between the seeds. The seeds are elliptic to oblong, 4–5.5 mm (0.16–0.22 in) long and dull black with a club-shaped aril.

== Taxonomy ==
In 1864, George Bentham formally described Acacia simsii var. multisiliqua in his Flora Australiensis, with the note "on first seeing R. Brown's specimens from the Carpentaria Islands, they looked so different from the ordinary form that I was inclined to adopt them as a distinct species under Brown's name of A. multisiliqua. In 1978, John Richard Maconochie raised the variety to species status as Acacia multisiliqua in the Journal of the Adelaide Botanic Gardens.

== Distribution and habitat ==
This species of wattle has a scattered distribution across the northern Kimberley region of Western Australia and Arnhem Land in the Northern Territory and its offshore islands, to northern Queensland near Lawn Hill and Cape Melville and south to Clermont. It grows on stony hills and slopes in sandstone country, sometimes in lateritic soil in open woodland.

== See also ==
- List of Acacia species
