= Gunlom Falls =

Gunlom Falls Waterfall Creek Falls
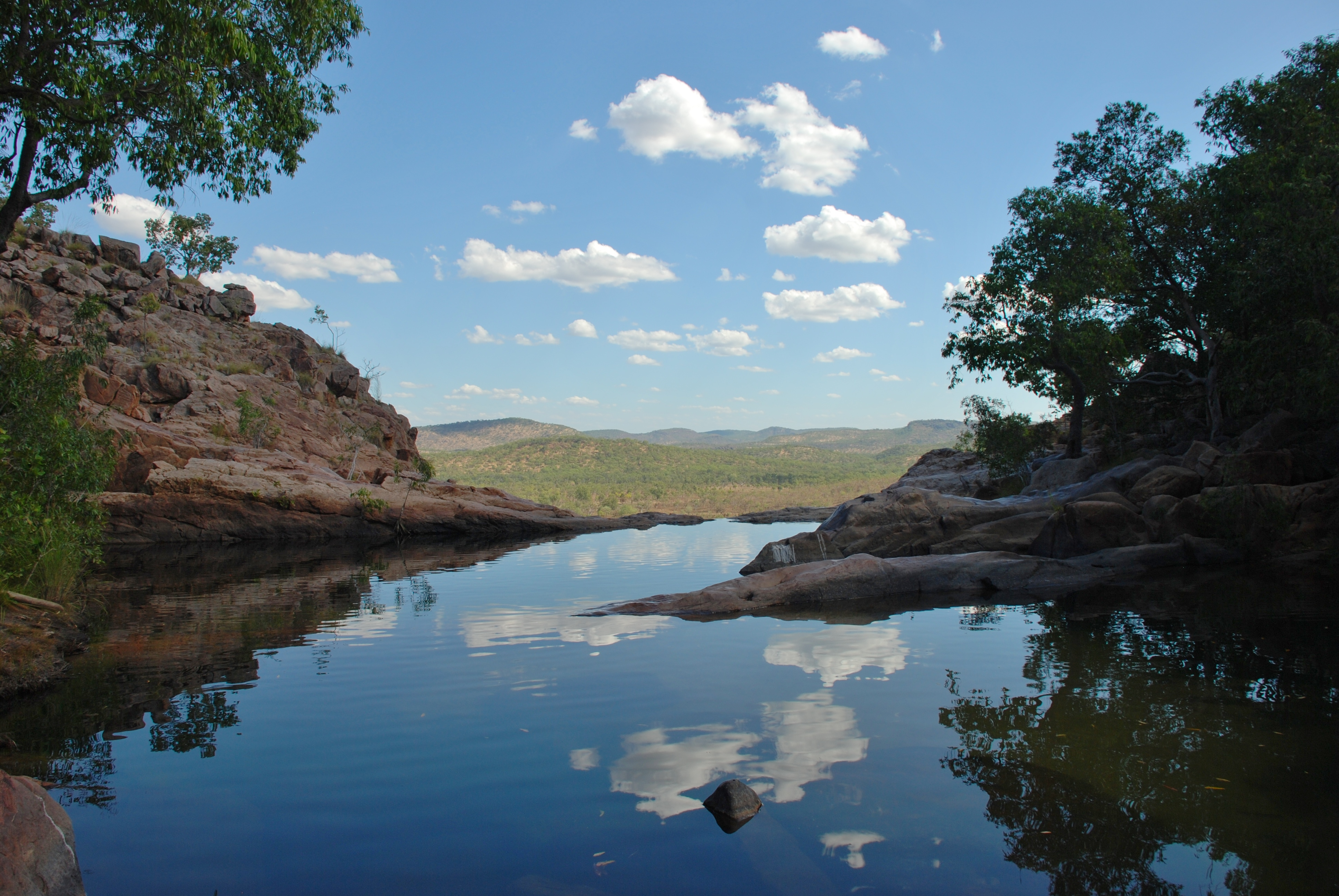
- Natural infinity pool at the top of Gunlom Falls Kakadu

- Location within Northern Territory
- Location: Kakadu National Park, Northern Territory, Australia
- Coordinates: 13°25′37″S 132°25′01″E
- Type: Cascade
- Elevation: 168 metres (551 ft) AHD
- Total height: 60–85 metres (197–279 ft)
- Watercourse: Waterfall Creek

The Gunlom Falls, formerly Waterfall Creek Falls, is a cascading waterfall on the Waterfall Creek located in the Kakadu National Park in the Northern Territory, Australia. The falls are also known as UDP Falls.

== Location and features ==
The falls descend from an elevation of 168 metres (551 ft) above sea level and range in height between 60–85 metres (197–279 ft) and are located in the Mary River area in the southern part of Kakadu, less visited by tourists.

Depending on the time of the year, the Gunlom Falls range from a roaring waterfall to a gentle trickle falling down the cliffs. This plunge pool at the bottom of the falls is one of the most visited places in the Kakadu National Park and a popular swimming hole.

A steep 15-minute climb leads to the top of the falls, with views over the southern region of the park. There is also a series of swimming holes at the top of the falls. The waterfall is approximately 40 kilometres (25 mi) from the Kakadu Highway on a gravel road, just inside the southern entry to the park. During the wet season (December to April), access is restricted. There is also a campground located near the falls.

The nearest accommodation is Cooinda Lodge, about two hours away in a vehicle, but there is a large public campground with hot showers and flushing toilets at the falls.

== Walking track closure ==
As of September 2020, the walking track to the lookout and pools above the falls is closed at the request of the Jawoyn traditional owners. It was closed before mid-2019, due to an investigation by the Aboriginal Areas Protection Authority (AAPA) into Parks Australia under the Northern Territory Aboriginal Sacred Sites Act 1989 (NT). The traditional owners allege that, in the process of upgrading the track, Parks Australia may have damaged a sacred site near the track. AAPA has filed charges against Parks Australia, which could lead to the authority being fined up to A$314,000. The matter was due to go before the court on 30 April 2021, but a request made by Parks Australia resulted in an adjournment. Parts of Gunlom remain closed.

== In film ==
In 1986, the falls appeared in the movie Crocodile Dundee starring Paul Hogan and Linda Kozlowski.

== See also ==
- List of waterfalls
- List of waterfalls in Australia
