= Tiwi Cobourg =

- Region
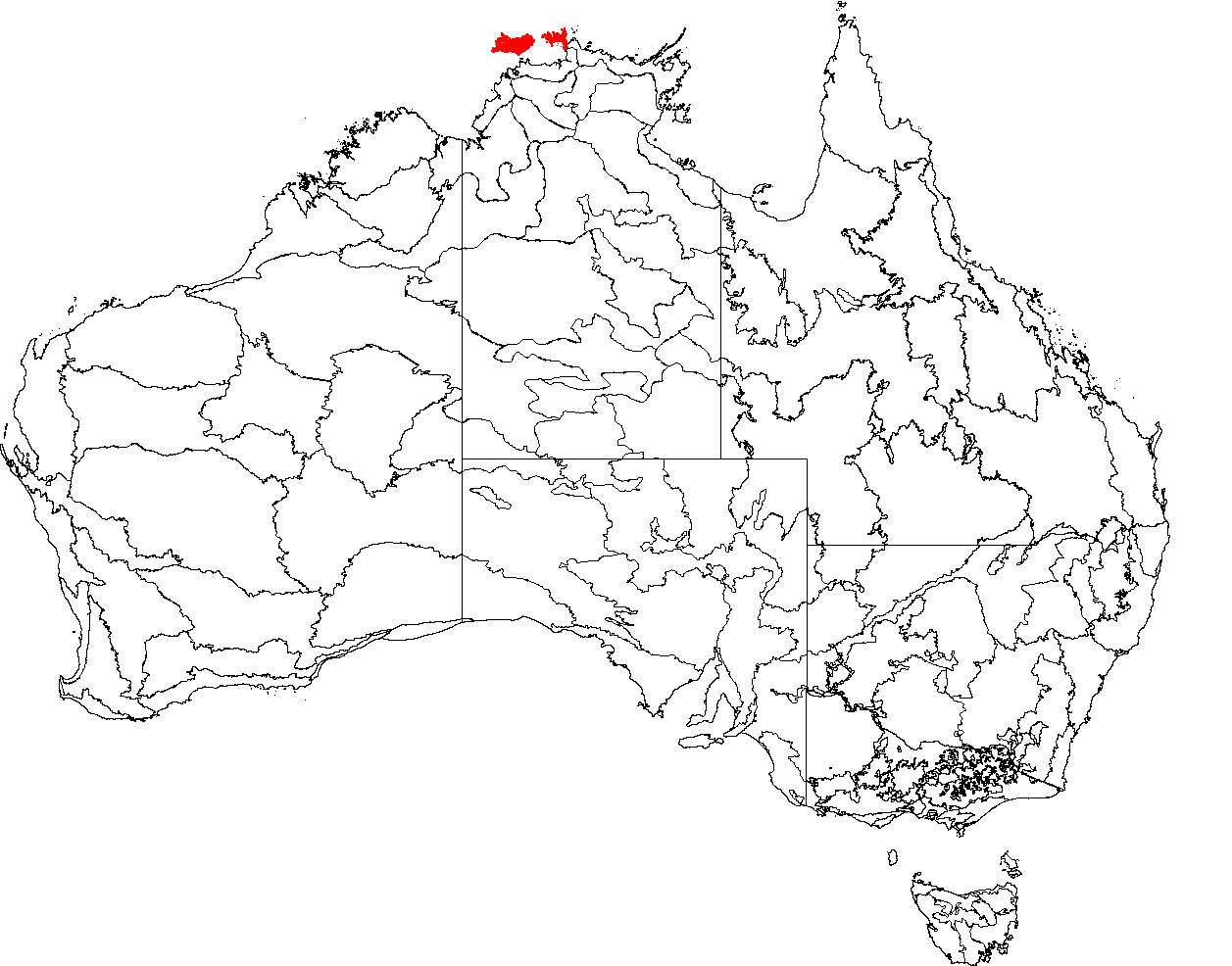
- The interim Australian bioregions, with Tiwi Cobourg in red
- Country: Australia
- State: Northern Territory

Area
  - Total: 10,105.8 km^{2} (3,901.9 sq mi)
Localities around Tiwi Cobourg
Timor Sea	Arafura Sea	Arafura Sea
Timor Sea	Tiwi Cobourg	Arnhem Coast
Beagle Gulf	Van Diemen Gulf	Darwin Coastal

Tiwi Cobourg is an interim Australian bioregion located in the Top End of the Northern Territory of Australia. It has an area of 1,010,580 hectares (2,497,200 acres), which includes the Cobourg Peninsula of Arnhem Land, Croker Island, and the Tiwi Islands. The bioregion is part of the Arnhem Land tropical savanna ecoregion.

Tiwi Cobourg consists of two subregions – Cobourg, which includes the Cobourg Peninsula and Croker Island, and Tiwi, which includes the Tiwi Islands.

== See also ==
- Geography of Australia
