= Daly Basin =

Bioregion in the Northern Territory, Australia

- Region
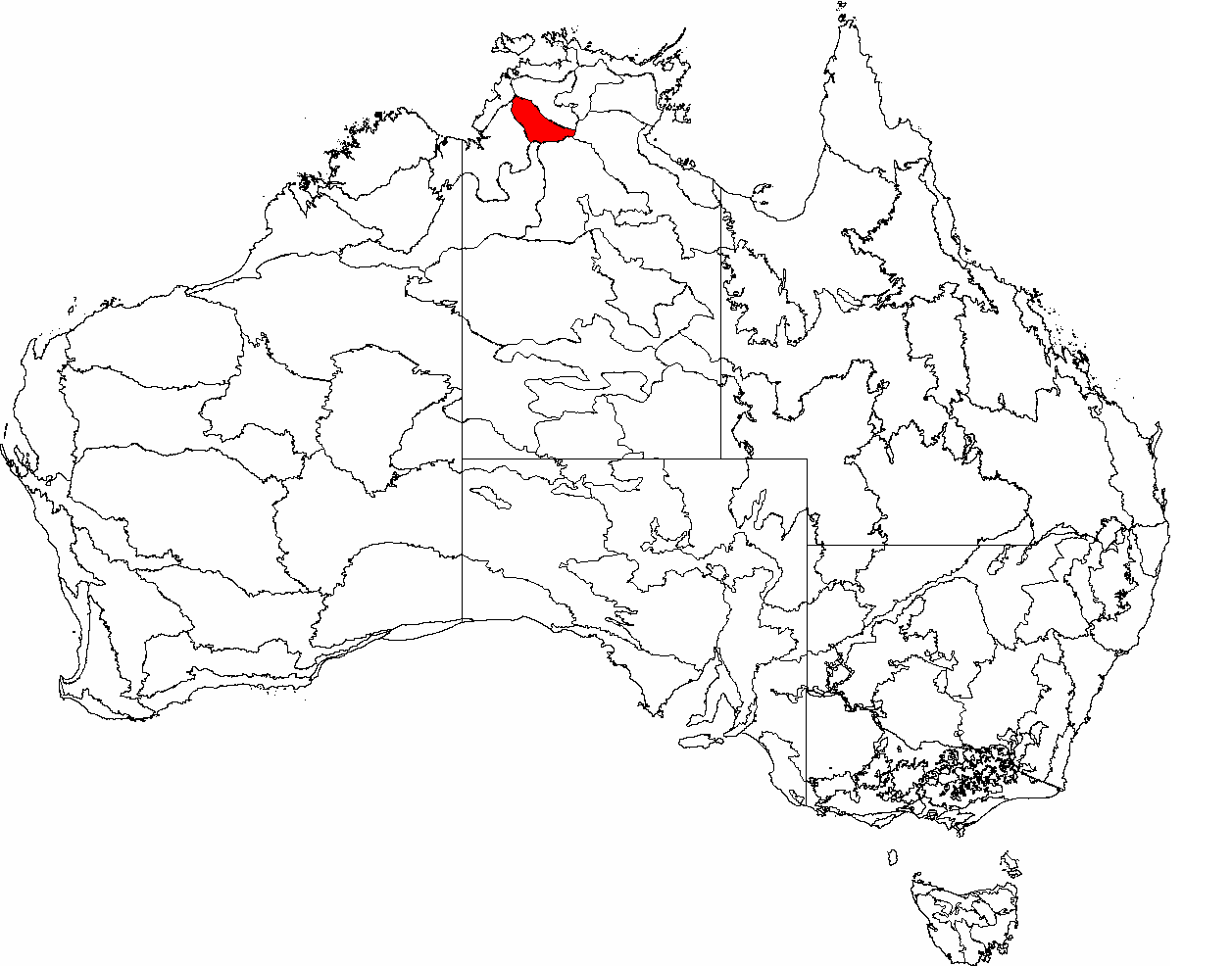
- The interim Australian bioregions, with the Daly Basin in red
- Country: Australia
- State: Northern Territory

Area
  - Total: 20,922 km^{2} (8,078 sq mi)
Localities around Daly Basin
Darwin Coastal	Darwin Coastal	Arnhem Plateau
Victoria Bonaparte	Daly Basin	Central Arnhem
Ord Victoria Plain	Sturt Plateau	Gulf Fall and Upland

The Daly Basin, an interim Australian bioregion, is located in the Northern Territory, comprising an area of 2,092,229 hectares (5,170,010 acres) of central Arnhem Land in the Top End of the Northern Territory.

The bioregion includes gently undulating plains with scattered low plateau remnants and some rocky hills and gorges along its western edge. The dominant vegetation is Darwin woolybutt (Eucalyptus miniata) and stringybark open forests. Land uses include extensive grazing, intensive horticulture, and tourism. There are also areas of Aboriginal land. The major population centre is Katherine.

== See also ==
- Geography of Australia
