= Arnhem Coast =

- Region
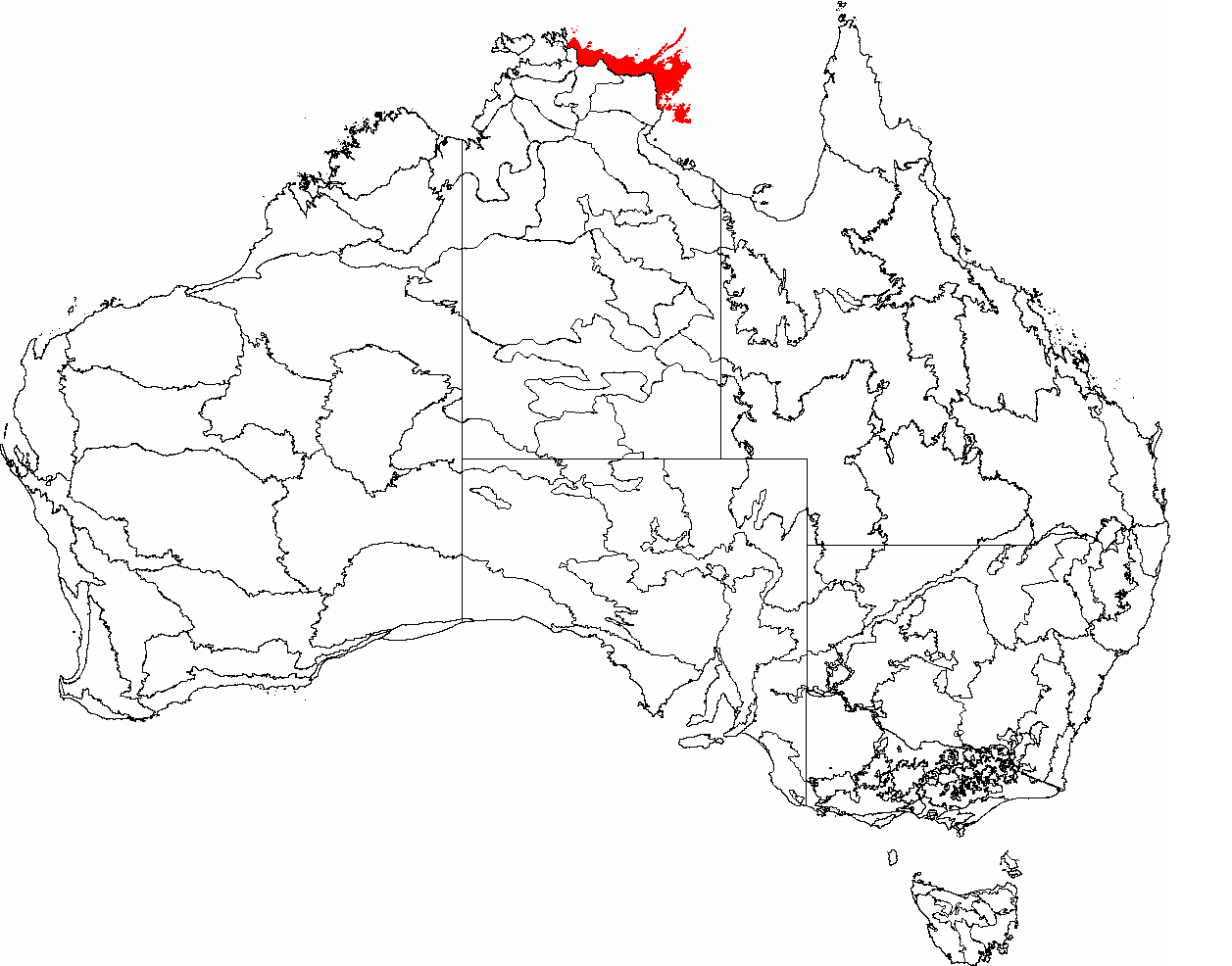
- The interim Australian bioregions, with the Arnhem Coast in red
- Country: Australia
- State: Northern Territory

Area
  - Total: 29,900 km^{2} (11,500 sq mi)
Localities around Arnhem Coast
Arafura Sea	Arafura Sea	Arafura Sea
Darwin Coastal	Arnhem Coast	Gulf of Carpentaria
Arnhem Plateau	Arnhem Plateau	Central Arnhem

The Arnhem Coast, an interim Australian bioregion, is located in the Northern Territory, comprising an area of 3,335,669 hectares (8,242,620 acres) of the coastal plains that characterises central Arnhem Land in the Top End of the Northern Territory.

== See also ==
- Geography of Australia
