= Victoria Bonaparte =

Bioregion in Western Australia and Northern Territory

Victoria Bonaparte Australia
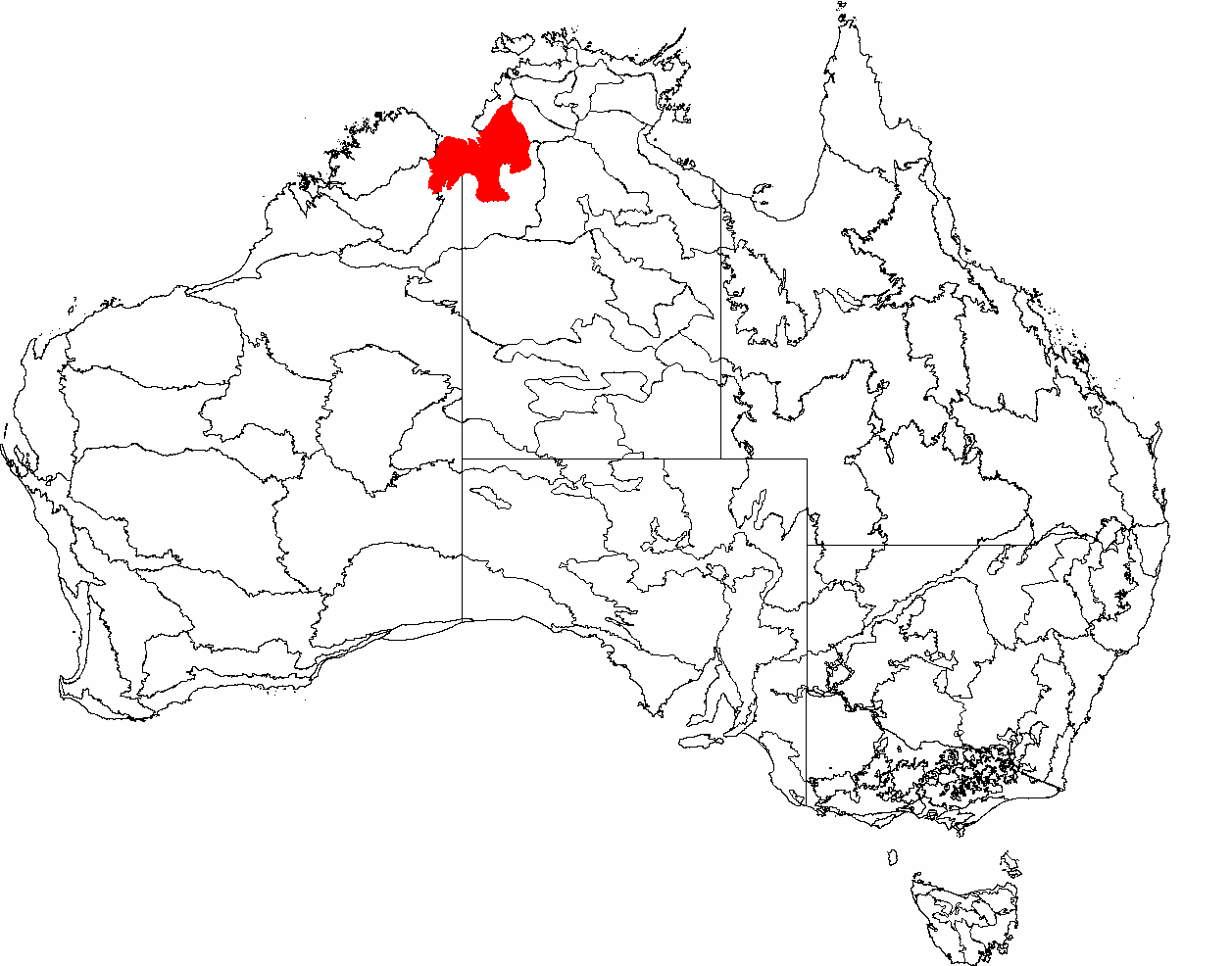
- The interim Australian bioregions, with Victoria Bonaparte in red
- Area: 73,012.42 km^{2} (28,190.3 sq mi)
Localities around Victoria Bonaparte:
| Timor Sea | Darwin Coastal | Darwin Coastal |
| Northern Kimberley | Victoria Bonaparte | Daly Basin |
| Central Kimberley | Ord Victoria Plain | Sturt Plateau |

The Victoria Bonaparte, an interim Australian bioregion, is located in the Northern Territory and Western Australia, comprising 7,301,242 hectares (18,041,760 acres).

The bioregion draws its name from the Victoria River and the Joseph Bonaparte Gulf.

== See also ==
- Geography of Australia
