= Darwin Coastal =

- Region
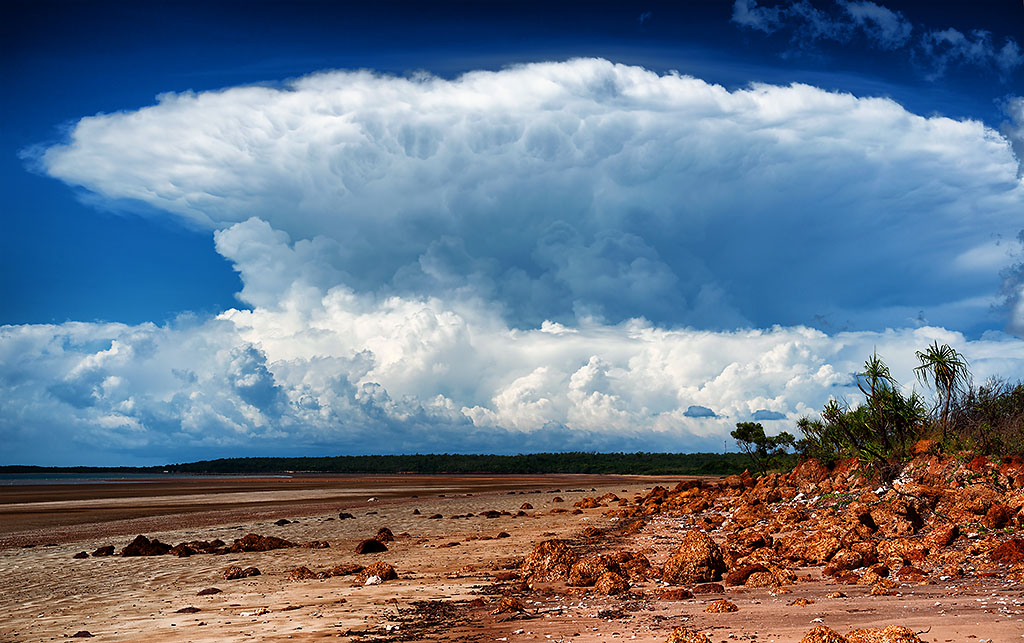
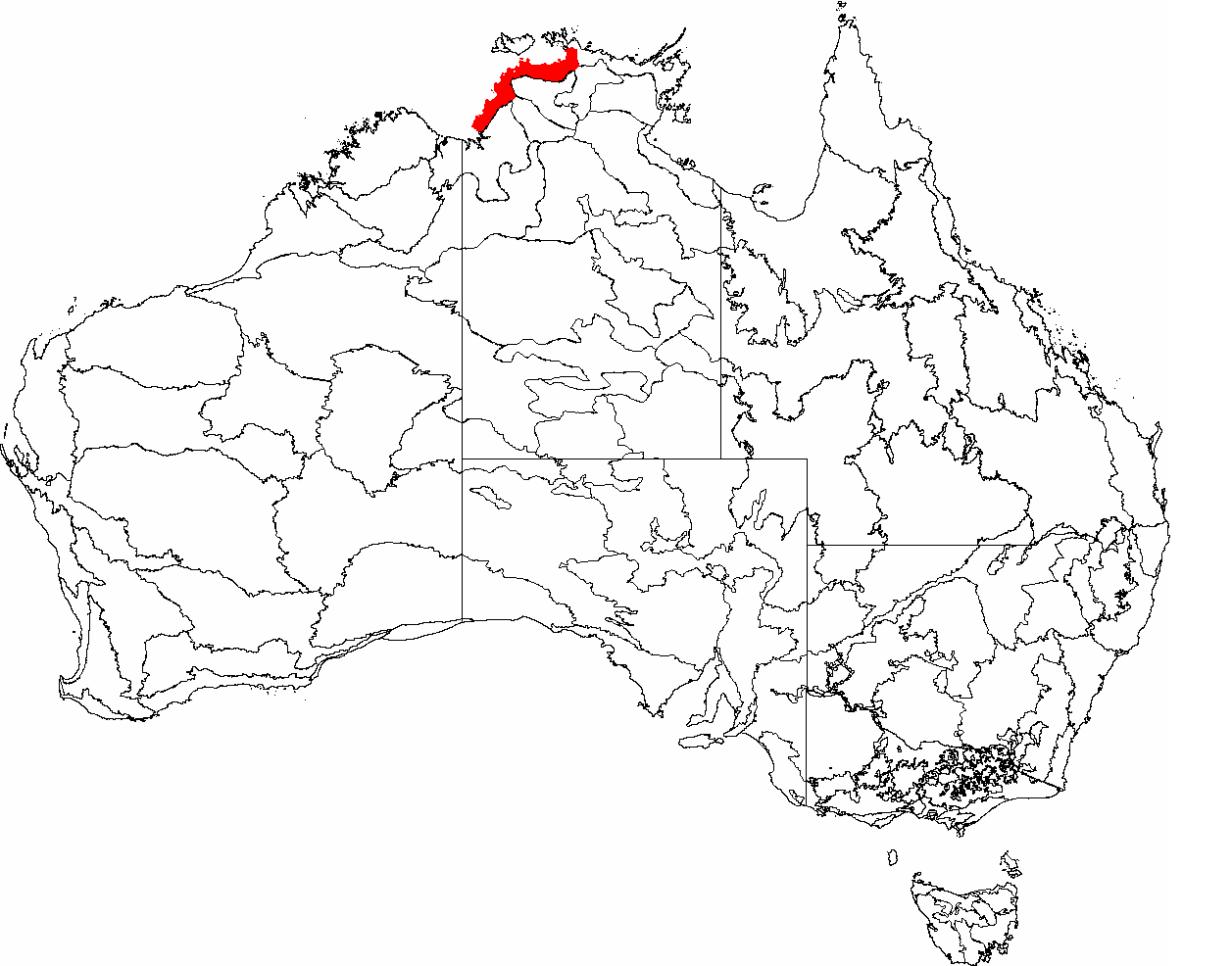
- Gunn Point, with Hector thundercloud in the background The interim Australian bioregions, with the Darwin Coastal in red
- Country: Australia
- State: Northern Territory

Area
  - Total: 27,800 km^{2} (10,700 sq mi)
Localities around Darwin Coastal
Timor Sea	Timor Sea	Arnhem Coast
Timor Sea	Darwin Coastal	Arnhem Coast
Victoria Bonaparte	Daly Basin	Arnhem Plateau

The Darwin Coastal, an IBRA bioregion, is located in the Northern Territory of Australia.

== Geography ==
It comprises an area of 2,843,199 hectares (7,025,700 acres) of central Arnhem Land, in the Top End of the Northern Territory.

This Interim Biogeographic Regionalisation for Australia (IBRA) bioregion is generally flat, low-lying coastlands, drained by several large rivers. Vegetation communities include eucalypt forest and woodlands with tussock grass and hummock grass understorey.

Land use is mixed, with urban development around Darwin, Aboriginal land, pastoral leases and conservation reserves. Major population centres are Darwin and Palmerston.

== See also ==
- Biogeography of the Northern Territory
- IBRA regions
