= Arnhem Plateau =

Bioregion in the Northern Territory, Australia

Coordinates: 13°11′28″S 133°10′50″E

- Region
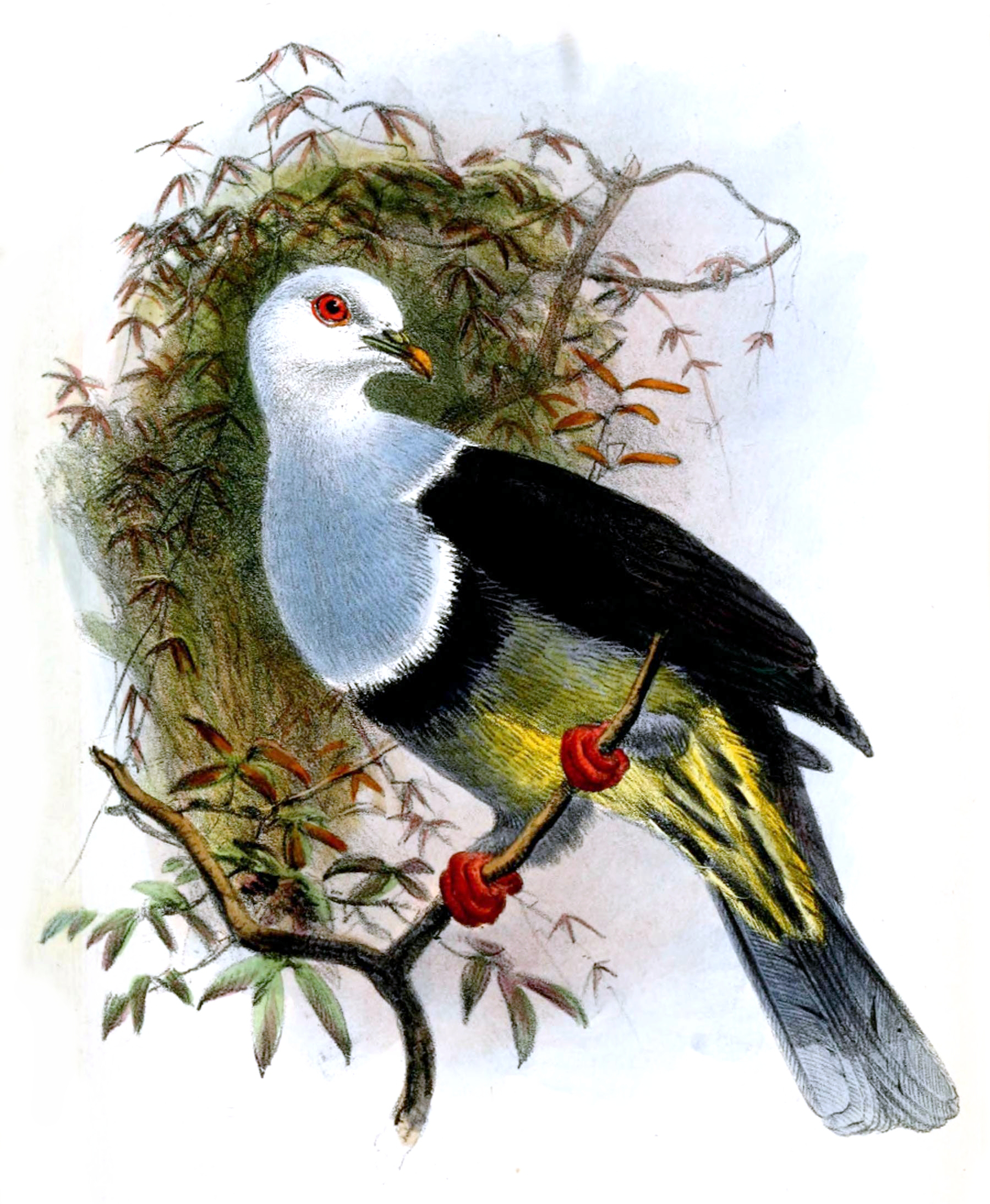
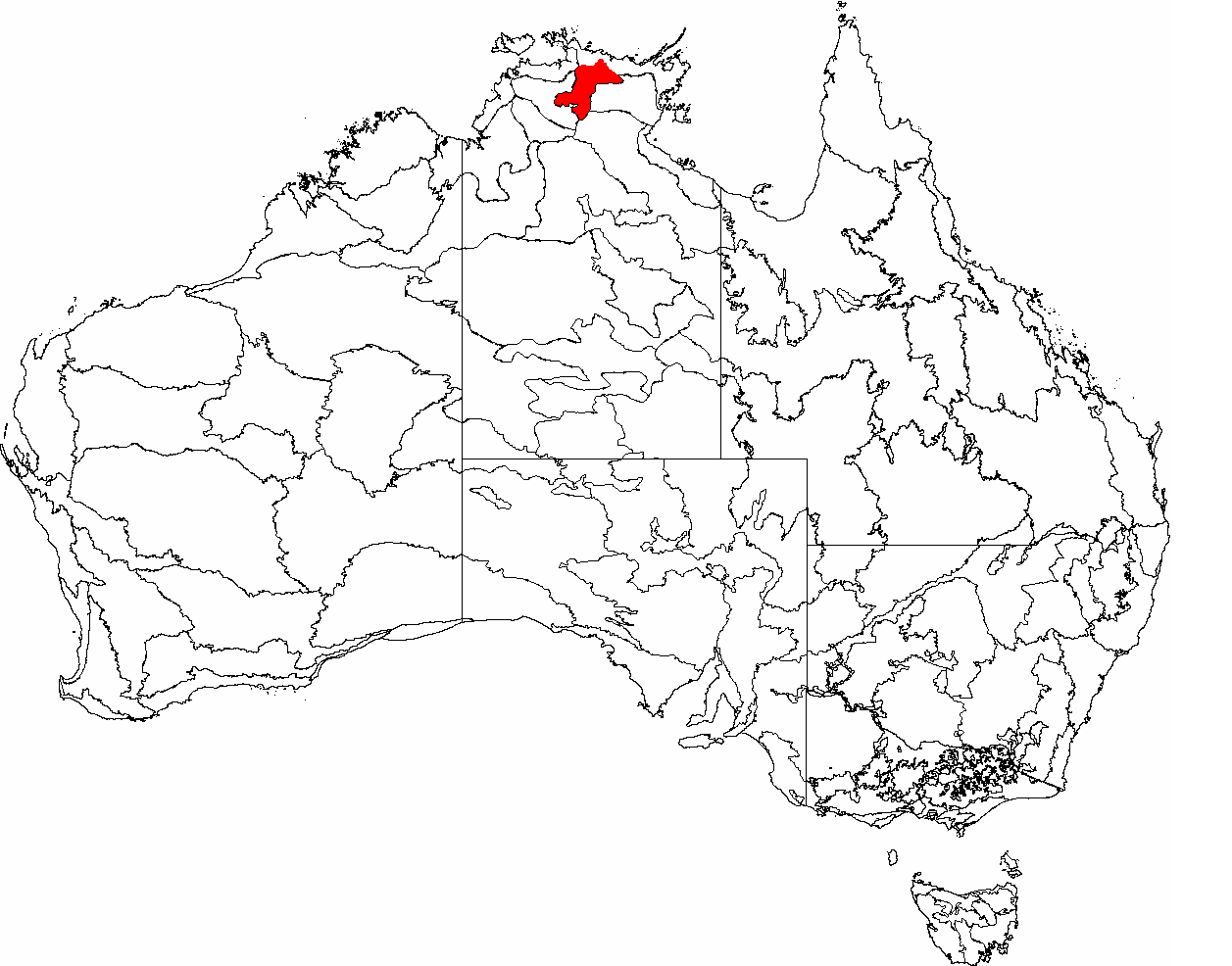
- The area is an important site for banded fruit doves The interim Australian bioregions, with the Arnhem Plateau in red
- Country: Australia
- State: Northern Territory

Area
  - Total: 23,060 km^{2} (8,900 sq mi)
Localities around Arnhem Plateau
Darwin Coastal	Arnhem Coast	Arnhem Coast
Pine Creek	Arnhem Plateau	Central Arnhem
Daly Basin	Sturt Plateau	Gulf Fall and Upland

The Arnhem Plateau is an Australian bioregion located in the Northern Territory of Australia, comprising an area of 2,306,023 hectares (5,698,310 acres) of the raised and heavily dissected sandstone plateau that characterises central Arnhem Land in the Top End of the Northern Territory.

== Description ==
The boundary of the 22,000-square-kilometre (8,500 sq mi) Important Bird Area (IBA) is largely defined by the extent of vegetation suitable for white-throated grasswrens. The most important habitat for grasswrens is bare rock and spinifex grassland. Other vegetation includes open monsoonal savanna woodland and patches of rainforest, especially that dominated by the endemic tree Allosyncarpia ternata. About a quarter of the IBA is within Kakadu National Park; a southern outlier is in Nitmiluk National Park, with much of the remainder due to be incorporated in the Wardekken Indigenous Protected Area.

=== Birds ===
Identified as an important bird area by BirdLife International, the plateau supports the entire population of white-throated grasswrens, and most of the populations of white-lined honeyeaters, chestnut-quilled rock-pigeons and the local subspecies of black-banded fruit doves and helmeted friarbirds. It also supports populations of bush stone-curlews, varied lorikeets, northern rosellas, rainbow pittas, white-gaped, yellow-tinted, bar-breasted and banded honeyeaters, silver-crowned friarbirds, masked and long-tailed finches, and sandstone shrike-thrushes.

== See also ==
- Birds of Australia
- Geography of Australia
