= Pine Creek bioregion =

Pine Creek
- Region
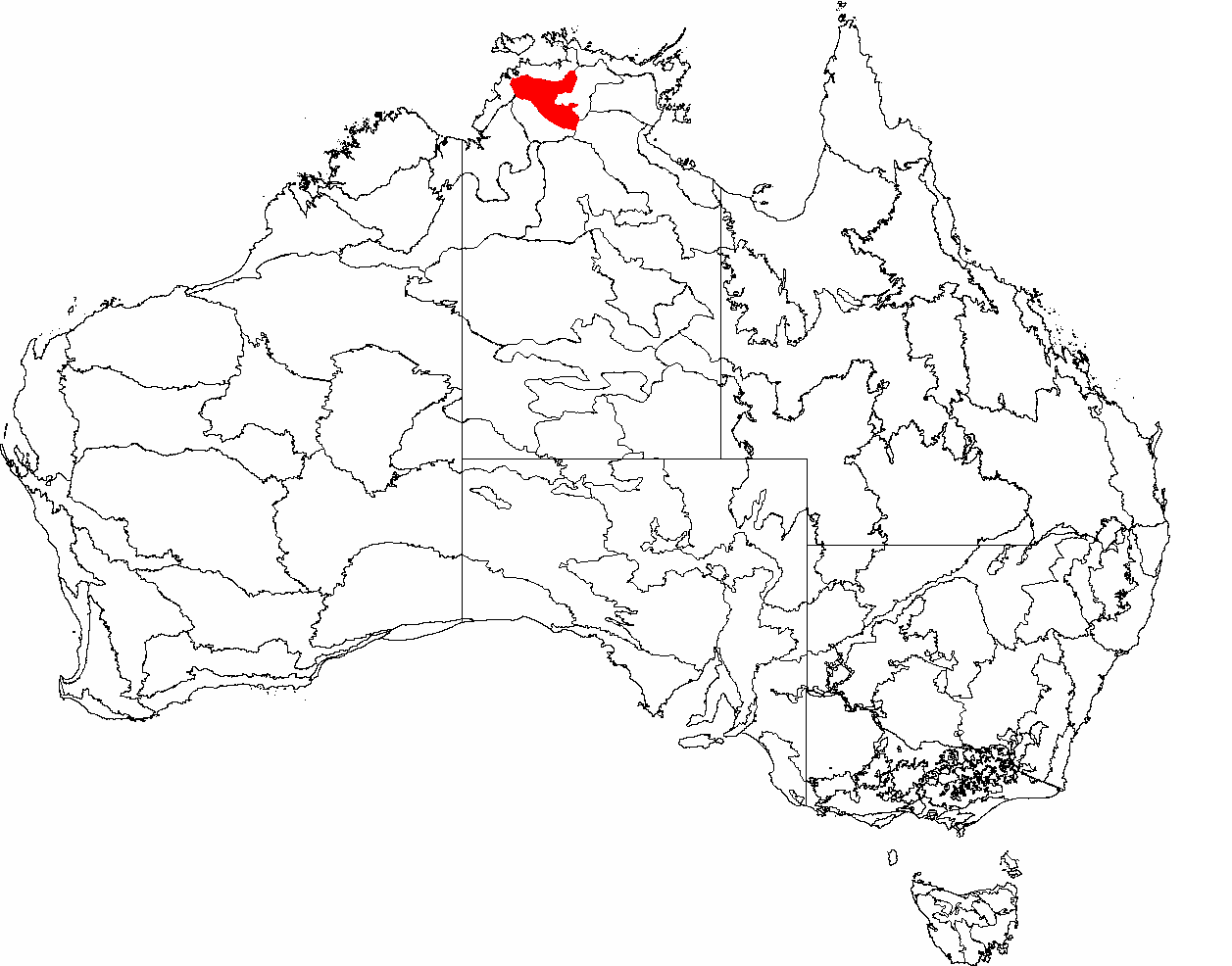
- The interim Australian bioregions, with Pine Creek in red
- Country: Australia
- State: Northern Territory

Area
  - Total: 28,517.77 km^{2} (11,010.77 sq mi)
Regions around Pine Creek
Darwin Coastal	Darwin Coastal	Arnhem Plateau
Darwin Coastal	Pine Creek	Arnhem Plateau
Daly Basin	Daly Basin	Gulf Fall and Uplands

The Pine Creek biogeographic region, an interim Australian bioregion, (abbreviation PCK) is located in the Northern Territory, and comprises 2,851,777 hectares (7,046,890 acres).

The bioregion draws its name from Pine Creek, and has the code PCK. There is just one subregion (PCK01, identical to the region.

== See also ==
- Geography of Australia
