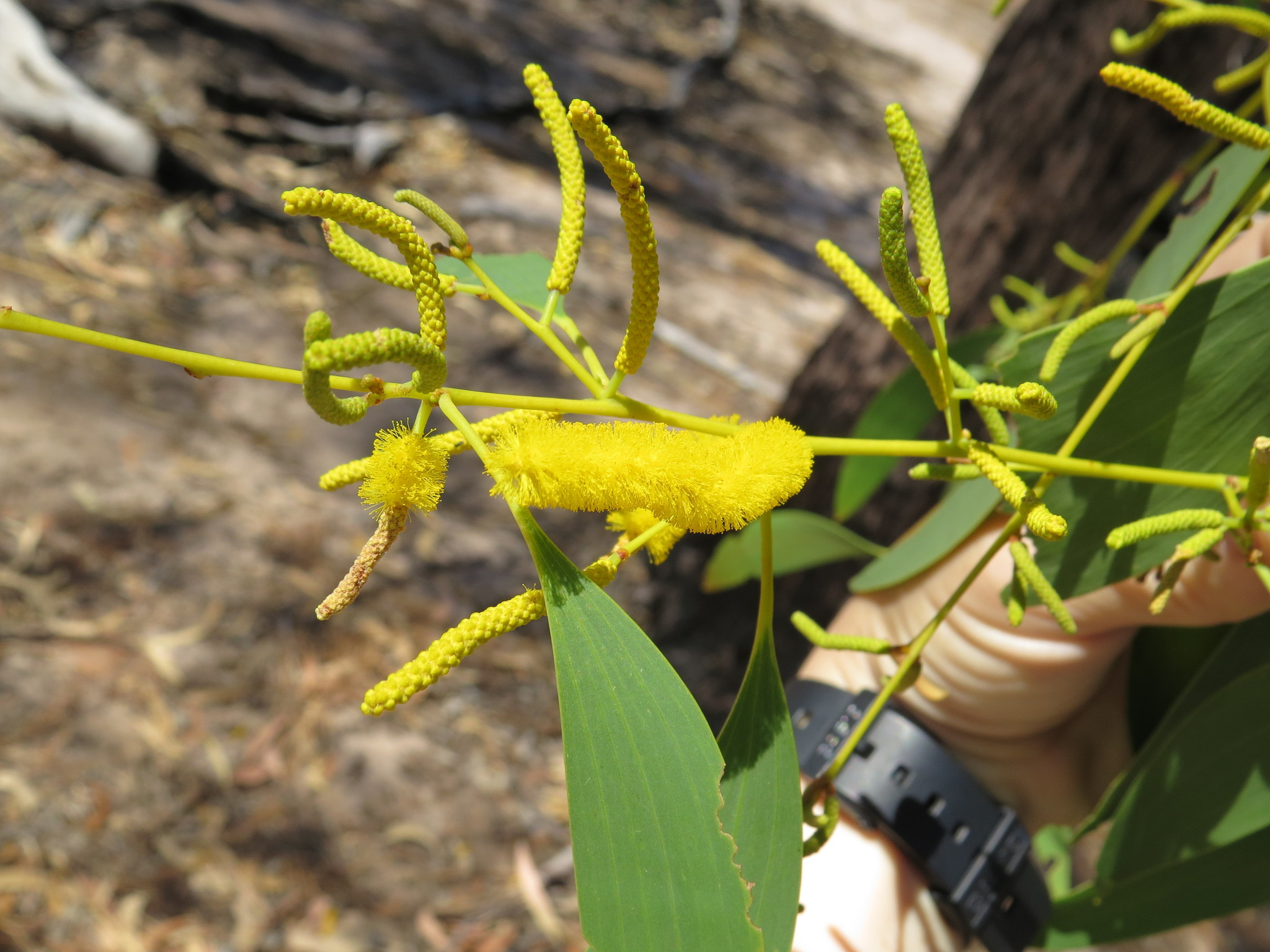

Scientific classification
- Kingdom: Plantae
- Clade: Embryophytes
- Clade: Tracheophytes
- Clade: Spermatophytes
- Clade: Angiosperms
- Clade: Eudicots
- Clade: Rosids
- Order: Fabales
- Family: Fabaceae
- Subfamily: Caesalpinioideae
- Clade: Mimosoid clade
- Genus: Acacia
- Species: A. difficilis

Binomial name
- Acacia difficilis Maiden
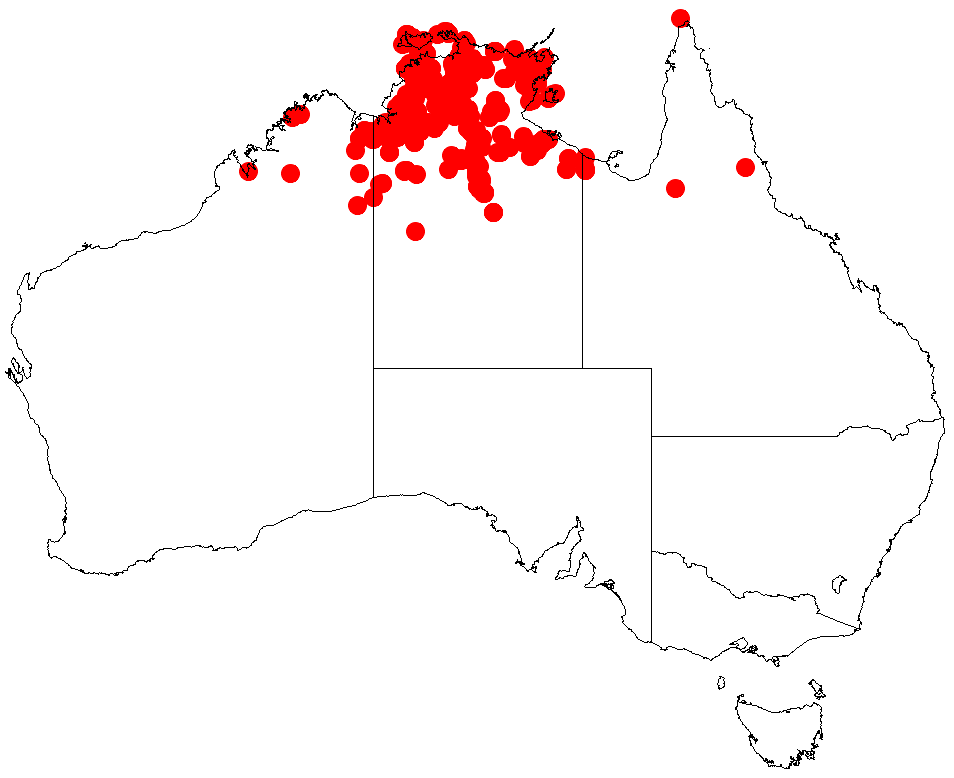
- Occurrence data from AVH

Synonyms
- Acacia tumida F.Muell. ex Benth. p.p.; Racosperma difficile (Maiden) Pedley

= Acacia difficilis =

Species of legume

Acacia difficilis, commonly known as river wattle, is a species of flowering plant in the family Fabaceae and is endemic to the tropical north of Australia. It is a shrub or tree with fibrous bark, elliptic to narrowly elliptic phyllodes, spikes of lemon yellow to golden yellow flowers and linear, leathery pods that more or less resemble a string of beads.

== Description ==
Acacia difficilis is a shrub or tree tree that typically grows to a height of 3.5–13 m (11–43 ft) and has fibrous, grey to brown bark on the trunk and branches. Its branchlets are almost terete, greyish brown and densely covered with soft hairs or sometimes glabrous. The phyllodes are elliptic to narrowly elliptic, mostly 70–140 mm (2.8–5.5 in) long and 15–40 mm (0.59–1.57 in) wide, thinly leathery with five to nine more or less prominent veins and densely covered with silvery white hairs when young. The flowers are lemon yellow to golden yellow and borne in spikes 15–50 mm (0.59–1.97 in) long in racemes 1–75 mm (0.039–2.953 in) long on peduncles 1–7 mm (0.039–0.276 in) long. Flowering mainly occurs from May to September, and the pods are linear, straight or curved, more or less resembling a string of beads, 30–155 mm (1.2–6.1 in) long and 2–4 mm (0.079–0.157 in) wide and leathery. The seeds are oblong, 5–9 mm (0.20–0.35 in) long, 2–4 mm (0.079–0.157 in) wide and black.

== Taxonomy ==
Acacia difficilis was first formally described in 1917 by Joseph Maiden in an appendix to Acacias of the Northern Territory edited by Alfred James Ewart and Olive Blanche Davies, collected by Gerald Freer Hill in 1916. The specific epithet (difficilis) means 'difficult', and "presumably refers to the difficulty the author had in distinguishing it from Acacia tumida".

== Distribution ==
River wattle is native to the Northern Kimberley bioregion of Western Australia, the Arnhem Coast, Arnhem Plateau, Central Arnhem, Daly Basin, Darwin Coastal, Davenport Murchison Ranges, Gulf Coastal, Gulf Fall and Uplands, Gulf Plains, Mitchell Grass Downs, Ord Victoria Plain, Pine Creek, Sturt Plateau, Tiwi Cobourg and Victoria Bonaparte bioregions of the Northern Territory, and to the far north-west of Queensland. It is grows in sandy or gravelly soils, often near watercourses, and is frequently associated with Eucalyptus tetrodonta.

== Conservation status ==
Acacia difficilis is listed as "not threatened" by the Government of Western Australia Department of Biodiversity, Conservation and Attractions, and as of "least concern" under the Territory Parks and Wildlife Conservation Act and the Queensland Government Nature Conservation Act 1992.

== See also ==
- List of Acacia species
