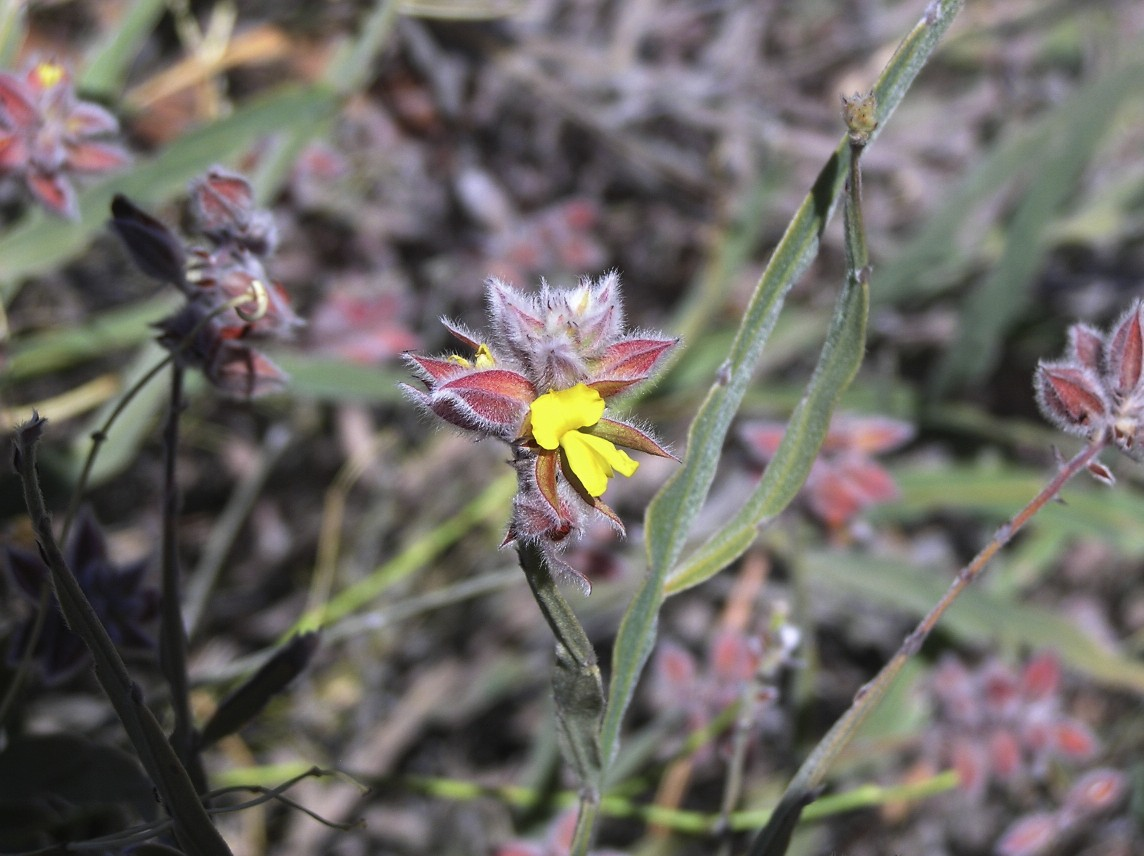

Scientific classification
- Kingdom: Plantae
- Clade: Tracheophytes
- Clade: Angiosperms
- Clade: Eudicots
- Clade: Rosids
- Order: Fabales
- Family: Fabaceae
- Subfamily: Faboideae
- Genus: Jacksonia
- Species: J. dilatata

Binomial name
- Jacksonia dilatata Benth.

Synonyms
- Piptomeris dilalata Greene orth. var.; Piptomeris dilatata (Benth.) Greene

= Jacksonia dilatata =

Species of legume

Jacksonia dilatata is a species of flowering plant in the family Fabaceae and is endemic to the northern Australia. It is usually an erect shrub or small tree with narrowly egg-shaped phylloclades, the leaves reduced scales, and yellow flowers in clusters of up to 20 at the ends of the phylloclades.

== Description ==
Jacksonia dilatata is usually a sturdy, erect shrub or tree that typically grows up to 1–5 m (3 ft 3 in – 16 ft 5 in) high and 0.5–2 m (1 ft 8 in – 6 ft 7 in) wide, or rarely a prostrate shrub. It has greyish-green, branches the end branchlets narrowly egg-shaped to narrowly elliptic or elliptic phylloclades 26–150 mm (1.0–5.9 in) long and 4–20 mm (0.16–0.79 in) wide, its leaves reduced to reddish-brown, egg-shaped scales, 0.7–2.8 mm (0.028–0.110 in) long and 0.5–1 mm (0.020–0.039 in) wide. The flowers are arranged in spike-like clusters of from 8 to 20 on the ends of phylloclades, each flower on a pedicel up to 0.7 mm (0.028 in) long, with broadly egg-shaped bracteoles 2.2–7.4 mm (0.087–0.291 in) long and 1.4–2.7 mm (0.055–0.106 in) wide. The floral tube is 0.7–1.5 mm (0.028–0.059 in) long and the sepals are membraneous, the upper lobes 5.1–6.2 mm (0.20–0.24 in) long and 1.9–2.0 mm (0.075–0.079 in) wide, the lower lobes slightly longer and narrower. The flowers are yellow, the standard petal 5.5–6.6 mm (0.22–0.26 in) long and 8–9 mm (0.31–0.35 in) wide, the wings 4.4–4.8 mm (0.17–0.19 in) long, and the keel 3.7–3.8 mm (0.15–0.15 in) long. The stamens have green filaments and are 2.2–5.2 mm (0.087–0.205 in) long. Flowering occurs from April to February, and the fruit is a membraneous pod 4.7–5.9 mm (0.19–0.23 in) long and 2.7–3.4 mm (0.11–0.13 in) wide.

== Taxonomy ==
Jacksonia dilatata was first formally described in 1837 by George Bentham in his Commentationes de Leguminosarum Generibus from specimens collected by Ferdinand Bauer. The specific epithet (dilatata) means 'enlarged' or 'widened'.

== Distribution and habitat ==
This species of Jacksonia commonly forms thickets in sandy soils on sandstone, sometimes on dunes on beaches and is mainly confined to the Arnhem Coast, Arnhem Plateau, Central Arnhem, Coolgardie, Daly Basin, Darwin Coastal, Gulf Coastal, Gulf Fall and Uplands, Gulf Plains, Ord Victoria Plain, Pine Creek, Sturt Plateau, Tiwi Cobourg and Victoria Bonaparte bioregions of the Northern Territory, but also occurs in Queensland.

== Conservation status ==
This species is listed as of "least concern" by the Northern Territory Territory Parks and Wildlife Conservation Act 1976 and the Queensland Government Nature Conservation Act 1992.
