= Acacia cyclocarpa =

Ring-pod minni-ritchie

Conservation status
- Priority Three — Poorly Known Taxa (DEC)

Scientific classification
- Kingdom: Plantae
- Clade: Tracheophytes
- Clade: Angiosperms
- Clade: Eudicots
- Clade: Rosids
- Order: Fabales
- Family: Fabaceae
- Subfamily: Caesalpinioideae
- Clade: Mimosoid clade
- Genus: Acacia
- Species: A. cyclocarpa

Binomial name
- Acacia cyclocarpa Maslin, M.D.Barrett & R.L.Barrett
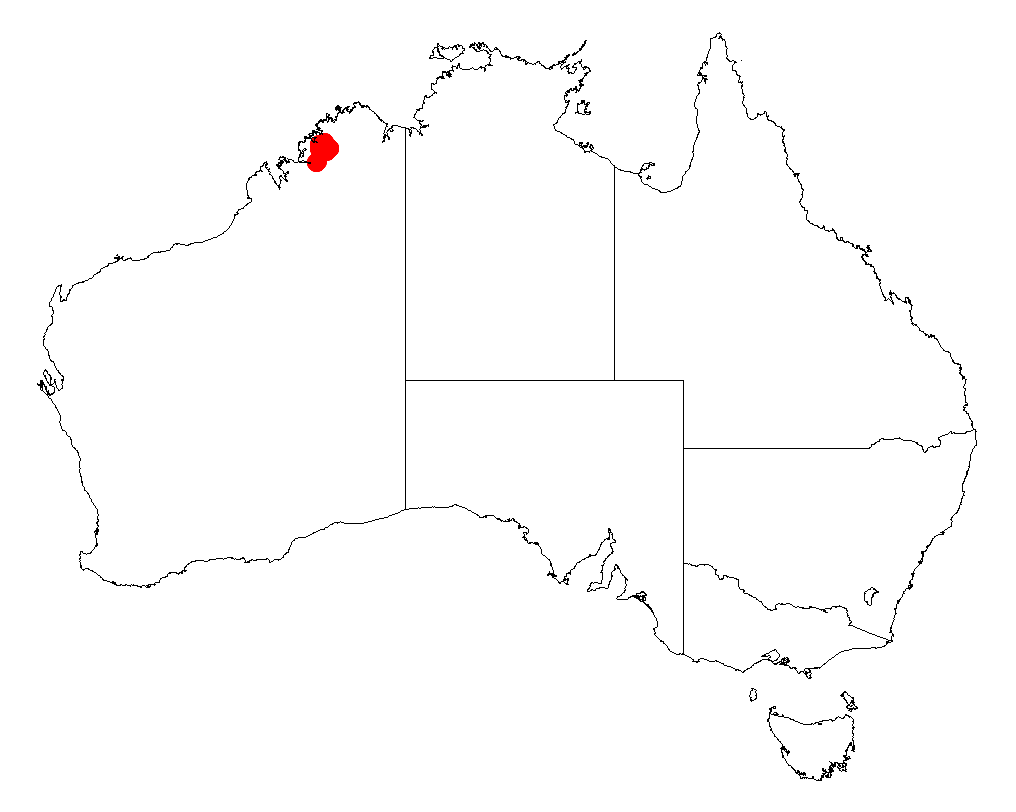
- Occurrence data from AVH

Synonyms
- Acacia sp. Pitta Creek (M.D.Barrett 1840)

Species of legume

Acacia cyclocarpa, commonly known as ring-pod minni-ritchi, is a species of flowering plant in the family Fabaceae and is endemic to the Kimberley region of Western Australia. It is a sprawling, low-lying to semi-erect shrub with narrowly linear phyllodes with a small point on the end, oblong to short-cylindrical of light golden yellow flowers and leathery, strongly curved pods, forming an open circle or coil.

== Description ==
Acacia cyclocarpa is a sprawling, low-lying to semi-erect, sticky shrub that typically grows up to 0.6 m (2 ft 0 in) and 1.5 m (4 ft 11 in) wide, and has minni ritchi style bark at the base of mature stems. Its branchlets are terete, finely ribbed and usually glabrous. The phyllodes are narrowly linear or sometimes linear to elliptic, 50–85 mm (2.0–3.3 in) long and 1.5–2.5 mm (0.059–0.098 in) wide with a fine, nornally curved point on the end. There are reddish brown, triangular stipules at the base of the phyllodes. The flowers are light golden yellow and borne in oval to short-cylindrical spikes 9–12 mm (0.35–0.47 in) long and 6–7 mm (0.24–0.28 in) wide. Flowering mainly occurs in the west season from January to April, and the pods are strongly curved into an open circle or coil, 5–7 mm (0.20–0.28 in) wide, glabrous and very sticky. The seeds are oblong, 4.5–5.0 mm (0.18–0.20 in) long and very dark brown to blackish except dull cream-coloured at the centre.

== Taxonomy ==
Acacia cyclocarpa was first formally described in 2013 by Bruce Maslin, Matthew David Barrett and Russell Lindsay Barrett in the journal Nuytsia from specimens collected in 1974 by Alex George in the Prince Regent Nature Reserve. The specific epithet (cyclocarpa) means 'circle-fruited'.

== Distribution and habitat ==
Ring-pod minni-ritchi grows in usually large populations of scattered plants in skeletal sandy soils over broken sandstone scattered over several kilometres in the north-west Kimberley bioregion. It grows in association with Acacia orthocarpa, A. prolata, Auranticarpa resinosa, Borya subulata, Eucalyptus miniata, E. phoenicea, E. rupestris, Owenia vernicosa and Triodia claytonii.

== Conservation status ==
Acacia cyclocarpa is listed as "Priority Three" by the Government of Western Australia, Department of Biodiversity, Conservation and Attractions, meaning that it is poorly known and known from only a few locations, but is not under imminent threat.

== See also ==
- List of Acacia species
