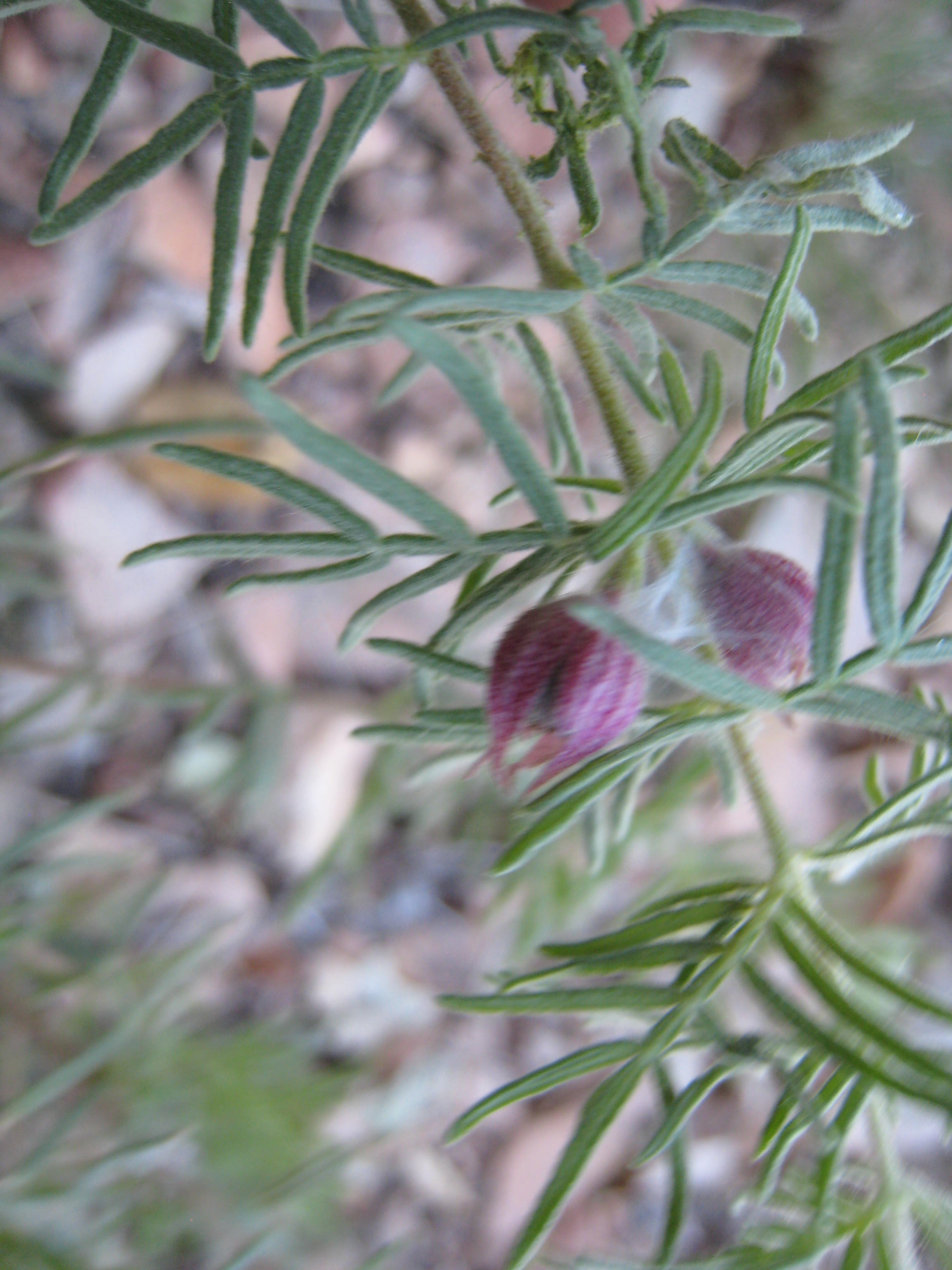
- Boronia lanuginosa, NT

Conservation status
- Least Concern (TPWCA)

Scientific classification
- Kingdom: Plantae
- Clade: Tracheophytes
- Clade: Angiosperms
- Clade: Eudicots
- Clade: Rosids
- Order: Sapindales
- Family: Rutaceae
- Genus: Boronia
- Species: B. lanuginosa

Binomial name
- Boronia lanuginosa Endl.
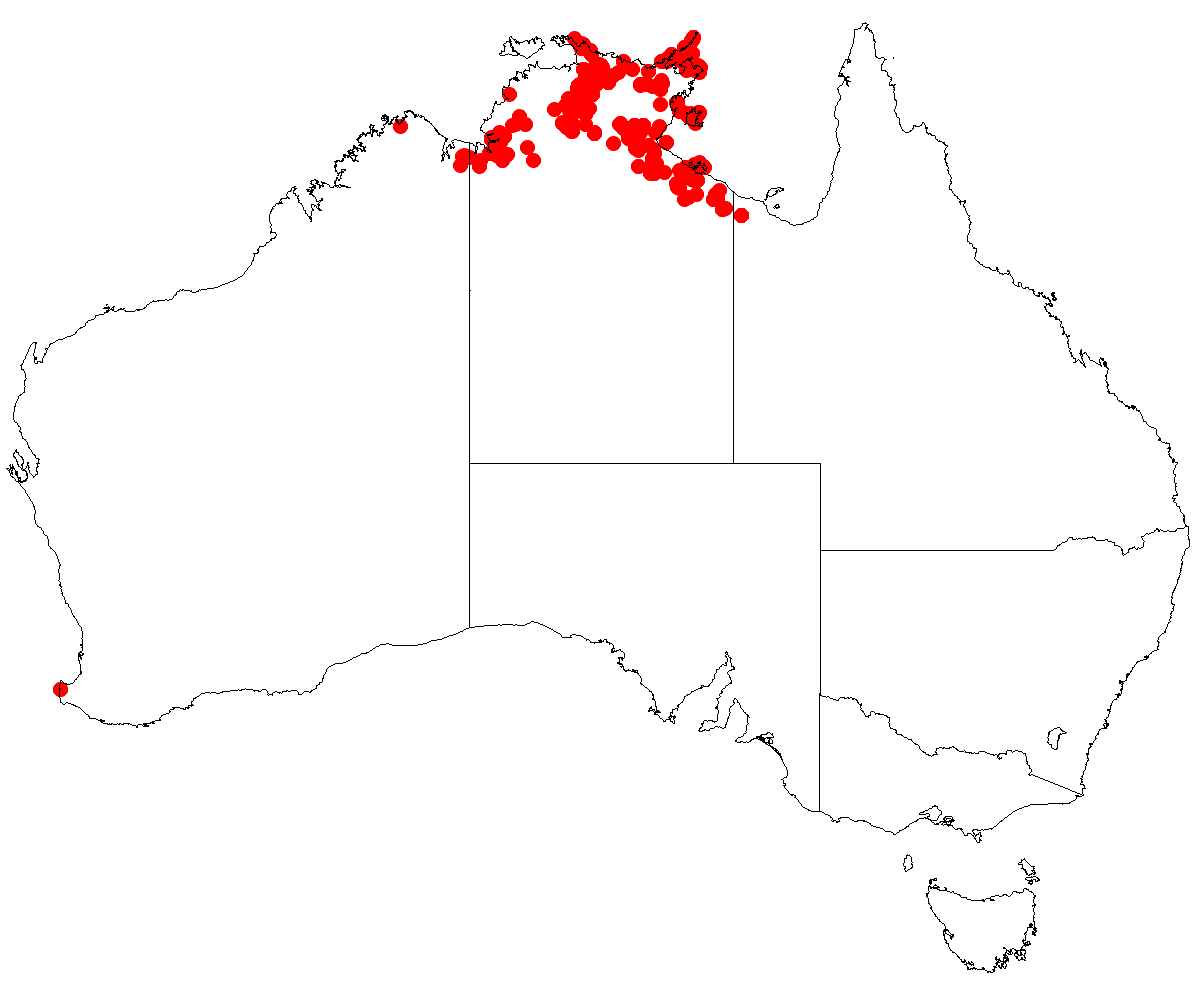
- Occurrence data from AVH

Synonyms
- Boronia artemisiifolia F.Muell.; Boronia artemisiifolia var. wilsonii Benth.

= Boronia lanuginosa =

Species of flowering plant

Boronia lanuginosa is a plant in the citrus family Rutaceae and is endemic to northern Australia. It is a shrub with woolly pinnate leaves.

== Description ==
Boronia lanuginosa is a perennial of a height from 0.4–1.5 m (1–5 ft). The leaves are pinnate, the pinnae being linear with revolute margins. Its flowers are white to pink and it flowers and fruits from January through to November (January to September.)

== Taxonomy and naming ==
This species was first formally described in 1837 by the Austrian botanist, Endlicher, who gave it the name Boronia lanuginosa. The specific epithet comes from the Latin, lanuginosa, meaning woolly or downy.

== Distribution and habitat ==
Boronia lanuginosa is found in Western Australia, the Northern Territory and Queensland. However, the occurrence records show this as an essentially Top End species. It is found in the IBRA regions of Victoria Bonaparte, Arnhem Coast, Arnhem Plateau, Central Arnhem, Daly Basin, Darwin Coastal, Gulf Coastal, Gulf Fall and Uplands, Gulf Plains, and Pine Creek. It grows on sandstone and sand, in gullies and creekbeds, and in woodland and forest.
