= Jacksonia arnhemica =

Scientific classification
- Kingdom: Plantae
- Clade: Tracheophytes
- Clade: Angiosperms
- Clade: Eudicots
- Clade: Rosids
- Order: Fabales
- Family: Fabaceae
- Subfamily: Faboideae
- Genus: Jacksonia
- Species: J. arnhemica

Binomial name
- Jacksonia arnhemica Chappill

Species of legume

Jacksonia arnhemica is a species of flowering plant in the family Fabaceae and is endemic to the Northern Territory. It is an erect, densely branched, delicate shrub, the end branches sharply-pointed phylloclades, with yellow flowers, and woody, hairy pods.

== Description ==
Jacksonia arnhemica is an erect, densely branched, delicate shrub that typically grows up to 1–2.5 m (3 ft 3 in – 8 ft 2 in) high and 1–2 m (3 ft 3 in – 6 ft 7 in) wide. Its end-branches are sharply pointed phylloclades, 0.5–0.6 mm (0.020–0.024 in) wide at their mid-point. The leaves are reduced to sharply-pointed, mid- to dark brown, egg-shaped scales, 0.5–1.2 mm (0.020–0.047 in) long and 0.3–0.7 mm (0.012–0.028 in) wide. The flowers are scattered along branches on pedicels 0.7–2.2 mm (0.028–0.087 in) long. There are egg-shaped bracteoles 0.6–1.3 mm (0.024–0.051 in) long and 0.4–0.6 mm (0.016–0.024 in) wide on the pedicels. The floral tube is 1.1–1.3 mm (0.043–0.051 in) long and the sepals are membranous, the lower lobes longer than the upper lobes, and fused at the base. The petals are yellow, the standard petal 4.7–5.5 mm (0.19–0.22 in) long, the wings 4.4–4.5 mm (0.17–0.18 in) long, and the keel 3.5–3.8 mm (0.14–0.15 in) long. The stamens have pink filaments 2.4–5.7 mm (0.094–0.224 in) long. Flowering occurs from March to October, and the fruit is a woody pod, 4.2–5.3 mm (0.17–0.21 in) long and 2.3–3.0 mm (0.091–0.118 in) wide, with white hairs pressed against the surface.

== Taxonomy ==
Jacksonia arnhemica was first formally described in 2007 by Jennifer Anne Chappill in Australian Systematic Botany from specimens collected near Malay Bay in 1987.

== Distribution and habitat ==
This species of Jacksonia grows in woodland in sand over sandstone in the north of the Northern Territory and offshore islands in the Arnhem Coast, Arnhem Plateau, Central Arnhem and Gulf Fall and Uplands bioregions of the Northern Territory.

== Conservation status ==
Jacksonia arnhemica is listed as "least concern" under the Territory Parks and Wildlife Conservation Act.
