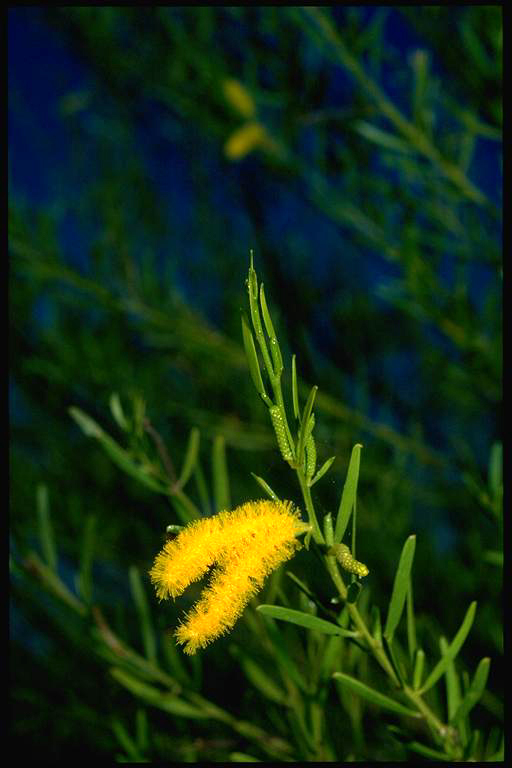
- In Gregory National Park

Scientific classification
- Kingdom: Plantae
- Clade: Embryophytes
- Clade: Tracheophytes
- Clade: Angiosperms
- Clade: Eudicots
- Clade: Rosids
- Order: Fabales
- Family: Fabaceae
- Subfamily: Caesalpinioideae
- Clade: Mimosoid clade
- Genus: Acacia
- Species: A. linarioides

Binomial name
- Acacia linarioides Benth.
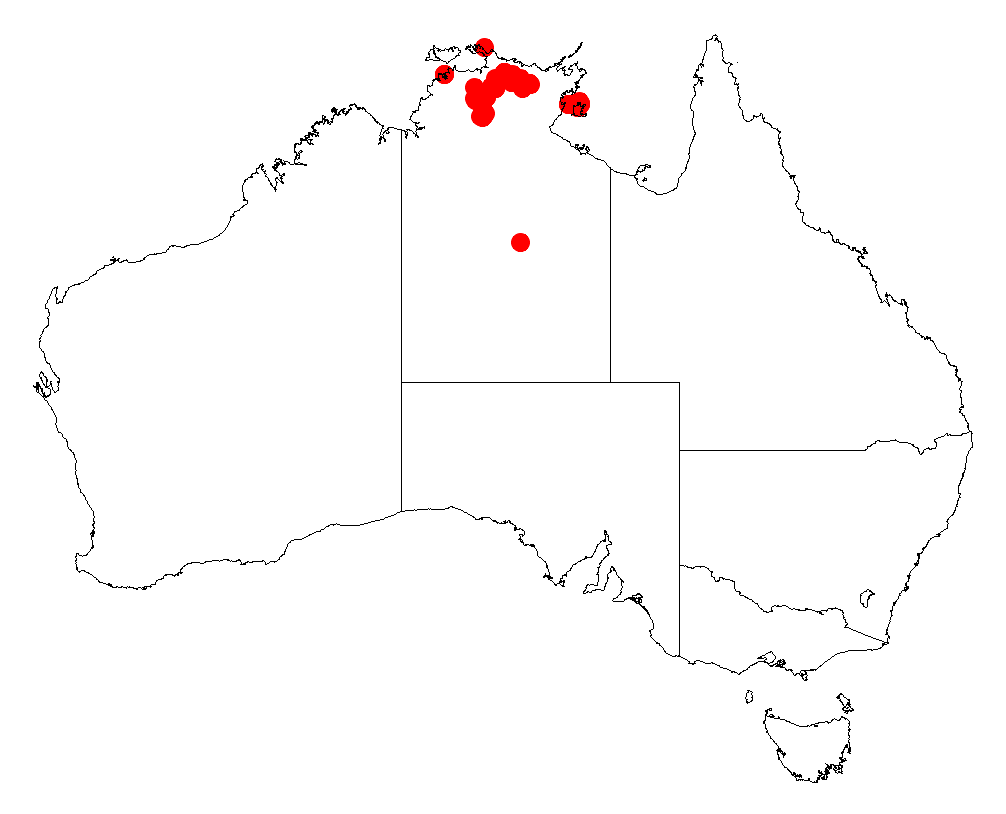
- Occurrence data from AVH

Synonyms
- Racosperma linarioides (Benth.) Pedley

= Acacia linarioides =

Species of legume

Acacia linarioides is a species of flowering plant in the family Fabaceae and is endemic to the Top End of the Northern Territory, Australia. It is a spreading shrub with smooth, dark grey bark, sometimes hairy branchlets, crowded linear to narrowly oblong phyllodes, spikes of golden yellow flowers, and straight to curved or open coiled pods, constricted between and raised over the seeds.

== Description ==
Acacia linarioides is a spreading shrub that typically grows to a height of up to 2.5 m (8 ft 2 in) and is slightly resinous. Its bark is more or less smooth, and its branchlets are glabrous, sometimes with a few hairs pressed against the surface. Its phyllodes are crowded, occasionally a few paired or whorled, linear to narrowly oblong, 10–40 mm (0.39–1.57 in) long and 0.4–2 mm (0.016–0.079 in) wide, mostly glabrous with a prominent midvein. The flowers are golden yellow, borne in a spike in axils, 20–43 mm (0.79–1.69 in) long on a peduncle 4–12 mm (0.16–0.47 in) long. Flowering occurs between January and July, and the pods are constricted between and raised over the seeds, more or less straight to curved or openly coiled after the seeds are released, 35–100 mm (1.4–3.9 in) long and 1.5–3.5 mm (0.059–0.138 in) long. The seeds are narrowly oblong, 2.3–2.8 mm (0.091–0.110 in) long and brownish black.

== Taxonomy ==
Acacia linarioides was first formally described in 1842 by George Bentham in Hooker's London Journal of Botany. The specific epithet (linarioides) means 'Linaria-like'.

== Distribution and habitat ==
This species of wattle usually grows in soils derived from sandstone on plateaux or in crevices, among rocks and in sand near creeks in the Top End of the Northern Territory and on some islands in the Gulf of Carpentaria, in the Arnhem Coast, Arnhem Plateau, Central Arnhem, Darwin Coastal, Gulf Fall and Uplands and Pine Creek bioregions.

== Conservation status ==
Acacia linarioides is listed as of 'least concern' under the Northern Territory Government Territory Parks and Wildlife Conservation Act.

== See also ==
- List of Acacia species
