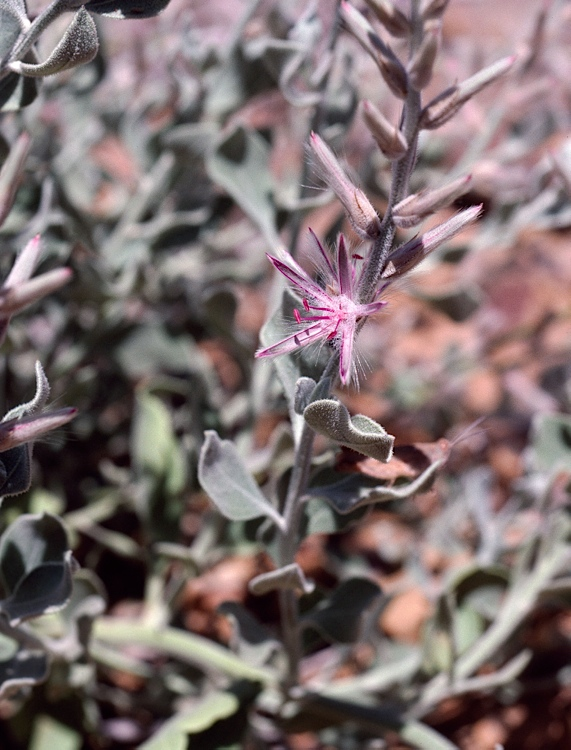

Scientific classification
- Kingdom: Plantae
- Clade: Tracheophytes
- Clade: Angiosperms
- Clade: Eudicots
- Order: Caryophyllales
- Family: Amaranthaceae
- Genus: Ptilotus
- Species: P. dissitiflorus

Binomial name
- Ptilotus dissitiflorus (F.Muell.) F.Muell.

Synonyms
- Ptilotus dissitiflorus (F.Muell.) F.Muell. var. dissitiflorus; Trichinium dissitiflorum F.Muell.

= Ptilotus dissitiflorus =

Species of grass-like plant

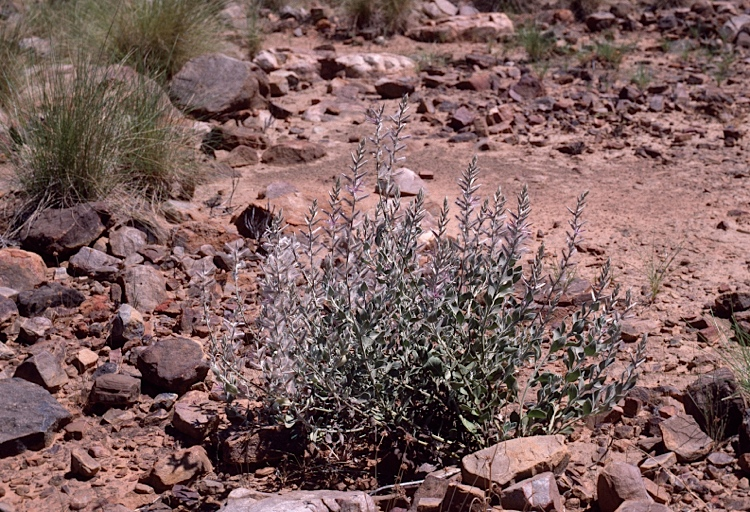
Habit near the Victoria River

Ptilotus dissitiflorus is a species of flowering plant in the family Amaranthaceae and is endemic to northern Australia.

In 1864, Ferdinand von Mueller described Trichinium dissitiflorum in his Fragmenta Phytographiae Australiae from specimens he collected "near drier places near the Gulf of Carpentaria", but in 1882 he transferred it to Ptilotus as P. dissitiflorus in his Systematic Census of Australian Plants. The specific epithet (dissitiflorus) means "with well-spaced flowers.

Ptilotus dissitiflorus is found in the Gulf Fall and Uplands, Ord Victoria Plain and Sturt Plateau bioregions of the Northern Territory, and in Queensland.

== See also ==
- List of Ptilotus species
