= Acacia anasilla =

Scientific classification
- Kingdom: Plantae
- Clade: Tracheophytes
- Clade: Angiosperms
- Clade: Eudicots
- Clade: Rosids
- Order: Fabales
- Family: Fabaceae
- Subfamily: Caesalpinioideae
- Clade: Mimosoid clade
- Genus: Acacia
- Species: A. anasilla

Binomial name
- Acacia anasilla A.S.George
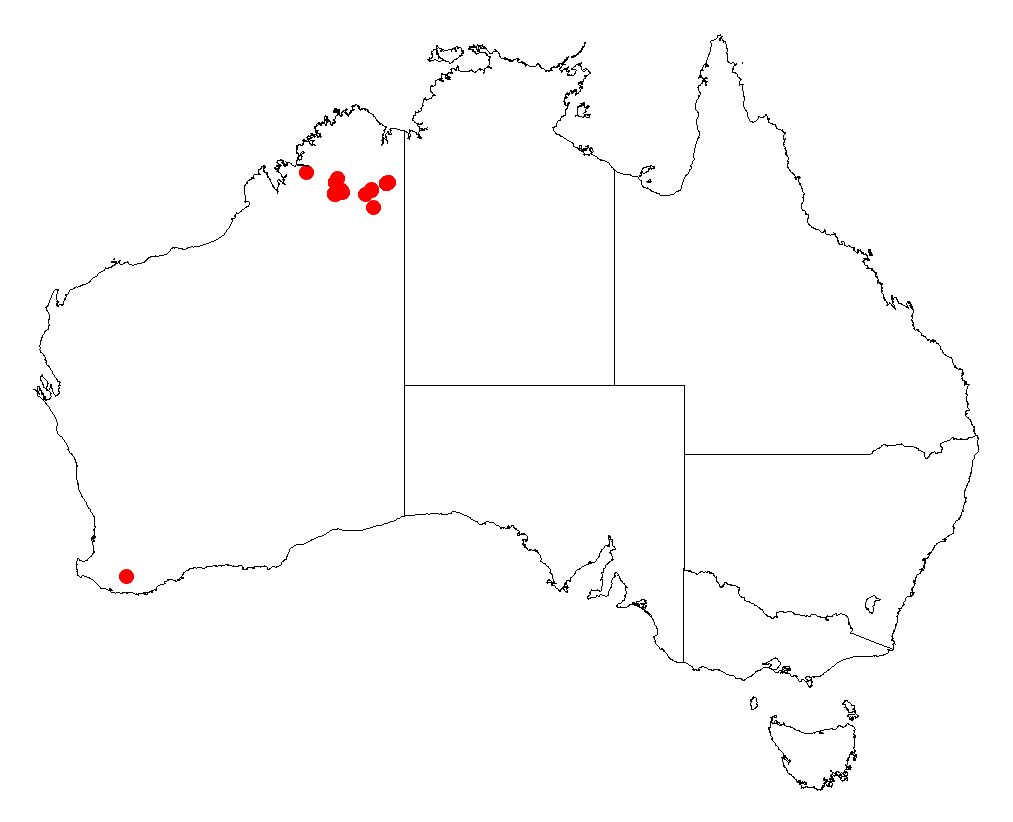
- Occurrence data from AVH

Synonyms
- Racosperma anasillum (A.S.George) Pedley

Species of legume

Acacia anasilla is a species of flowering plant in the family Fabaceae and is endemic to northern Western Australia. It is an erect shrub with whorls of 15 to 20 straight phyllodes and spherical heads of 40 to 50 flowers, and pods 20–30 mm (0.79–1.18 in) long.

== Description ==
Acacia anasilla is an erect shrub that typically grows to a height of up to 1.5–2 m (4 ft 11 in – 6 ft 7 in) and has sticky, hairy stems. Its phyllodes are straight or gently curved and arranged around a flowering stem in whorls of 15 to 20 5–10 mm (0.20–0.39 in) long, with a bristly hair on the end. There are erect, tapering stipules 1.5–2 mm (0.059–0.079 in) long at the base of the phyllodes. 40 to 50 densely packed yellow flowers are arranged in spherical heads on a peduncle 15–30 mm (0.59–1.18 in) long. The sepals are about 8 mm (0.31 in) long and the petals striated and 2.0–2.3 mm (0.079–0.091 in) long. Flowering occurs in July, and the fruit is a sessile pod 20–25 mm (0.79–0.98 in) long and 5–6 mm (0.20–0.24 in) wide containing between 3 and 10 seeds, each about 4 mm (0.16 in) long with a large aril.

== Taxonomy ==
Acacia anasilla was first formally described in 1999 by the botanist Alexander Segger George in the Journal of the Royal Society of Western Australia. The type specimen was collected from Mabel Downs Station near Winnimarra Spring in 1989 by K.A.Menkhorst. It is similar in appearance to Acacia lycopodiifolia and Acacia smeringa. The specific epithet (anasilla) means 'bristling hair', referring to the overall appearance of the plant.

== Distribution ==
This species of Acacia is endemic to an area in the Kimberley region of Western Australia where it is found in arid barren quartzite ranges or on granite or sandstone slopes as a part of open Eucalyptus brevifolia woodland communities. Early collections were made around Halls Creek and the Ord River.

== See also ==
- List of Acacia species
