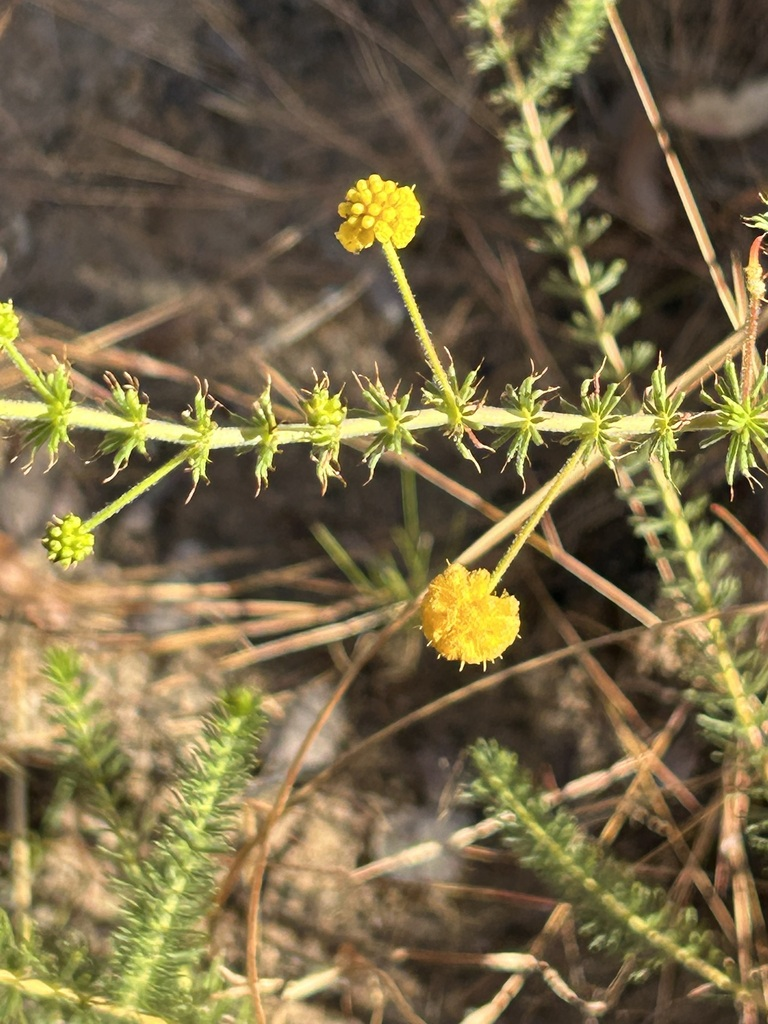

Scientific classification
- Kingdom: Plantae
- Clade: Embryophytes
- Clade: Tracheophytes
- Clade: Spermatophytes
- Clade: Angiosperms
- Clade: Eudicots
- Clade: Rosids
- Order: Fabales
- Family: Fabaceae
- Subfamily: Caesalpinioideae
- Clade: Mimosoid clade
- Genus: Acacia
- Species: A. smeringa

Binomial name
- Acacia smeringa A.S.George

= Acacia smeringa =

Species of legume

Acacia smeringa is a shrub belonging to the genus Acacia and the subgenus Lycopodiifoliae. It is native to an area in the Kimberley region of Western Australia.

The erect viscid shrub typically grows to 1 metre (3 ft). It flowers during May to June and is most closely related to Acacia dimorpha and Acacia prolata.

== See also ==
- List of Acacia species
