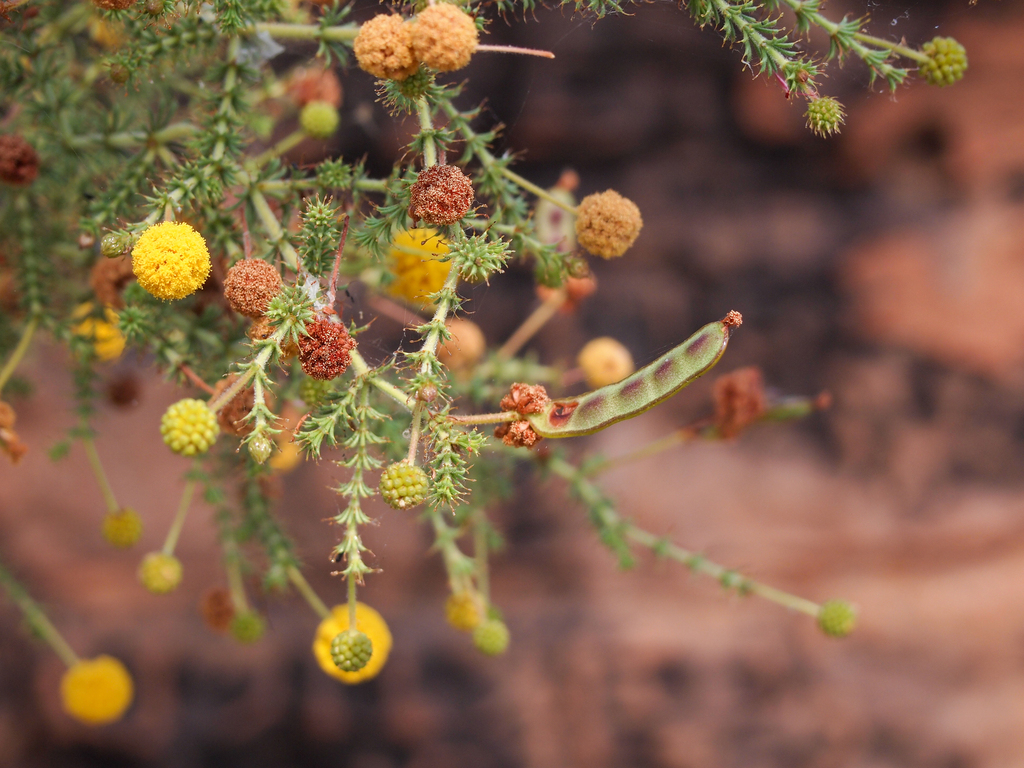
- Near the Victoria Highway, Gregory, Northern Territory

Scientific classification
- Kingdom: Plantae
- Clade: Tracheophytes
- Clade: Angiosperms
- Clade: Eudicots
- Clade: Rosids
- Order: Fabales
- Family: Fabaceae
- Subfamily: Caesalpinioideae
- Clade: Mimosoid clade
- Genus: Acacia
- Species: A. lycopodiifolia

Binomial name
- Acacia lycopodiifolia A.Cunn. ex Hook.
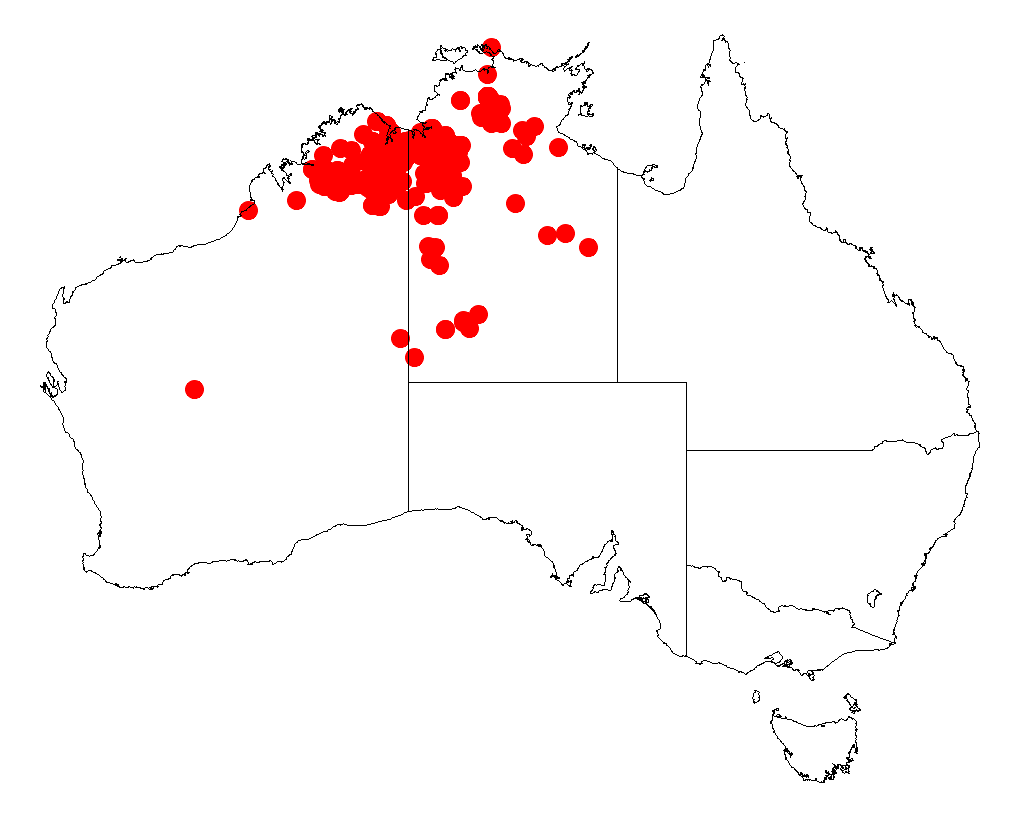
- Occurrence data from AVH

Synonyms
- Acacia lycopodifolia Benth. orth. var.; Acacia lycopodifolia var. setifera Domin orth. var.; Acacia lycopodifoli var. typica Domin orth. var.; Acacia lycopodiifolia A.Cunn. ex Hook. var. lycopodiifolia; Acacia lycopodiifolia var. setifera Domin; Acacia lycopodiifolia var. typica Domin nom. inval.; Racosperma lycopodiifolium (Hook.) Pedley

= Acacia lycopodiifolia =

Species of legume

Acacia lycopodiifolia is a species of flowering plant in the family Fabaceae and is endemic to the north-western Australia. It is a spreading shrub with hairy branchlets, spreading to erect, whorls of hairy phyllodes, spherical heads of yellow flowers, and sessile pods.

== Description ==
Acacia lycopodiifolia is a semi-prostrate, spreading to ascending, sticky shrub that typically grows to a height of 0.2–1 m (7.9 in – 3 ft 3.4 in) high and has soft or velvety hairy branchlets. The phyllodes are spreading to erect, arranged in whorls of mostly 10 to 14, 2–4 mm (0.079–0.157 in) long, straight or curved, slightly flattened and sometimes sticky. The phyllodes have an impressed vein on the lower surface, and a curved, bristle-like point on the end. The flowers are yellow and borne in spherical heads of 30 to 40 on a peduncle 10–24 mm (0.39–0.94 in) long. Flowering occurs in most months, and the pods are sessile, up to 55 mm (2.2 in) long, 4–6 mm (0.16–0.24 in) wide, sometimes with slightly thickened margins, and are occasionally covered with soft hairs.

== Taxonomy ==
Acacia lycopodiifolia was firstly formally described in 1837 by William Jackson Hooker in his Icones Plantarum from an unpublished description by Allan Cunningham of a specimen Cunningham collected at Cambridge Gulf. The specific epithet (lycopodiifolia) means 'Lycopodium-leaved'.

== Distribution and habitat ==
This species of wattle is found in the Central Kimberley, Dampierland, Northern Kimberley, Ord Victoria Plain, Victoria Bonaparte bioregions of Western Australia and the Arnhem Plateau, Central Kimberley, Daly Basin, Gulf Fall and Uplands, Northern Kimberley, Ord Victoria Plain, Pine Creek, Sturt Plateau, Tanami and Victoria Bonaparte bioregions of the Northern Territory. It grows in shallow, rocky, sandstone soil on hills.

== See also ==
- List of Acacia species
