= Acacia kimberleyensis =

Conservation status
- Priority Two — Poorly Known Taxa (DEC)

Scientific classification
- Kingdom: Plantae
- Clade: Embryophytes
- Clade: Tracheophytes
- Clade: Spermatophytes
- Clade: Angiosperms
- Clade: Eudicots
- Clade: Rosids
- Order: Fabales
- Family: Fabaceae
- Subfamily: Caesalpinioideae
- Clade: Mimosoid clade
- Genus: Acacia
- Species: A. kimberleyensis

Binomial name
- Acacia kimberleyensis W.Fitzg.
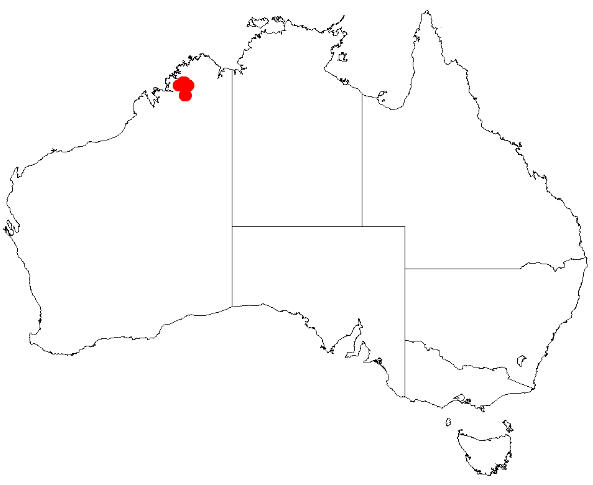
- Occurrence data from AVH

Synonyms
- Racosperma kimberleyense (W.Fitzg.) Pedley

Species of legume

Acacia kimberleyensis is a species of flowering plant in the family Fabaceae and is endemic to the Kimberley region of northern Western Australia. It is a shrub with linear phyllodes, spikes of yellow flowers and thinly crust-like, narrowly linear pods.

== Description ==
Acacia kimberleyensis is an erect, slightly sticky, glabrous shrub that typically grows to a height of up to 1.5 m (4 ft 11 in) and has slender, finely ribbed branchlets that are resinous, at least when young. The phyllodes are narrowly linear, 80–160 mm (3.1–6.3 in) long and 0.8–1.8 mm (0.031–0.071 in) wide, flat or four-sided in cross section, with three to seven veins on each side when flat, the central vein slightly more pronounced. The flowers are yellow and borne in mostly two narrow spikes 20–30 mm (0.79–1.18 in) long in axils on peduncles 5–10 mm (0.20–0.39 in) long. Flowering occurs in June and July and the pods are narrowly linear, thinly crust-like, 70–100 mm (2.8–3.9 in) long and about 2 mm (0.079 in) wide, the edges very narrowly winged with wings about 1 mm (0.039 in) wide. The seeds are narrowly oblong, about 6 mm (0.24 in) long, greenish black with a conical aril.

== Taxonomy ==
Acacia kimberleyensis was first formally described in 1917 by William Vincent Fitzgerald in the Journal and Proceedings of the Royal Society of New South Wales from specimens he collected in the Packhorse Range in the Kimberley district. The specific epithet (kimberleyensis) means 'native of the Kimberley district'.

== Distribution and habitat ==
This species of wattle is only known from the Packhorse Range and on Mt. Agnes, about 80 km (50 mi) to the north in the western part of the Kimberley region. The type specimens were collected in an area dominated by Eucalyptus miniata woodland over spinifex on sandstone.

== Conservation status ==
Acacia kimberleyensis is listed as "Priority Two" by the Western Australian Government Department of Biodiversity, Conservation and Attractions, meaning that it is poorly known and from only one or a few locations.

== See also ==
- List of Acacia species
