= Eucalyptus rupestris =

Prince Regent gum

Scientific classification
- Kingdom: Plantae
- Clade: Tracheophytes
- Clade: Angiosperms
- Clade: Eudicots
- Clade: Rosids
- Order: Myrtales
- Family: Myrtaceae
- Genus: Eucalyptus
- Species: E. rupestris

Binomial name
- Eucalyptus rupestris Brooker & Done

Species of eucalyptus

Eucalyptus rupestris, commonly known as Prince Regent gum, is a species of small tree that is endemic to the Kimberley region of Western Australia. It has smooth bark, elliptical to egg-shaped or broadly lance-shaped adult leaves, flower buds in groups of seven, white flowers and cup-shaped to more or less cylindrical fruit.

== Description ==
Eucalyptus rupestris is a tree that typically grows to a height of 4–8 m (13–26 ft) and forms a lignotuber. It has smooth, white to grey bark that is pale orange and powdery when new. Young plants and coppice regrowth have egg-shaped to round leaves that are 50–70 mm (2.0–2.8 in) long and 35–80 mm (1.4–3.1 in) wide and petiolate. Adult leaves are arranged alternately, the same shade of dull green on both sides, elliptic, to egg-shaped or broadly lance-shaped, 37–75 mm (1.5–3.0 in) long and 10–25 mm (0.39–0.98 in) wide, tapering to a petiole 8–18 mm (0.31–0.71 in) long. The flower buds are mostly arranged in leaf axils in groups of seven, sometimes clustered near the ends of branchlets, on a peduncle 3–5 mm (0.12–0.20 in) long, the individual buds on pedicels up to 2 mm (0.079 in) long. Mature buds are oval to cylindrical, about 4 mm (0.16 in) long and 3 mm (0.12 in) wide with a conical to rounded operculum. Flowering occurs from May to August and the flowers are white. The fruit is a woody cup-shaped to more or less cylindrical capsule 3–5 mm (0.12–0.20 in) long and 3–4 mm (0.12–0.16 in) wide with the valves near rim level.

== Taxonomy and naming ==
Eucalyptus rupestris was first formally described in 1986 by Ian Brooker and Christopher Charles Done from material collected in Prince Regent River Reserve by Alex George in 1974. The specific epithet (rupestris) is a Latin word meaning "rocky", referring to the situation in which this species is usually found.

== Distribution and habitat ==
Prince Regent gum grows in sand on sandstone ridges, including near the Prince Regent River, Mitchell River and Drysdale River National Park in the Kimberley region.

== Conservation status ==
This eucalypt is classified as "not threatened" in Western Australia by the Western Australian Government Department of Parks and Wildlife.

== See also ==
- List of Eucalyptus species
