= Acacia dimorpha =

Conservation status
- Priority One — Poorly Known Taxa (DEC)

Scientific classification
- Kingdom: Plantae
- Clade: Tracheophytes
- Clade: Angiosperms
- Clade: Eudicots
- Clade: Rosids
- Order: Fabales
- Family: Fabaceae
- Subfamily: Caesalpinioideae
- Clade: Mimosoid clade
- Genus: Acacia
- Species: A. dimorpha

Binomial name
- Acacia dimorpha Maslin, M.D.Barrett & R.L.Barrett
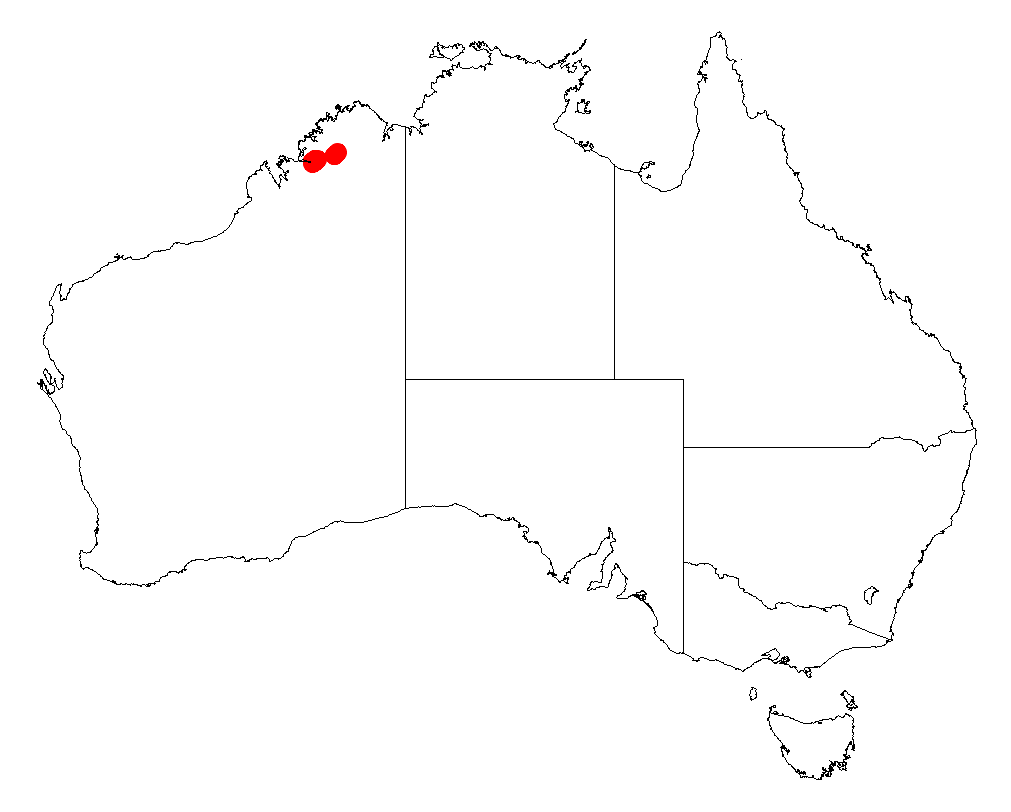
- Occurrence data from AVH

Species of legume

Acacia dimorpha, commonly known as Artesian Range whorled wattle, is a species of flowering plant in the family Fabaceae and is endemic northern Western Australia. It is an erect shrub with branchlets covered with short, white hairs, whorls of linear phyllodes of two different forms with stipules at the base, heads of yellow flowers and narrowly oblong, thinly leathery pods.

== Description ==
Acacia dimorpha is an erect shrub that typically grows to a height of 0.4–1 m (1 ft 4 in – 3 ft 3 in) and has branchlets covered with soft, short hairs. Its phyllodes are arranged in regular whorls of 11 to 18, 5–10 mm (0.20–0.39 in) apart. The upper phyllodes, at the base of the flowers, are linear, 2–5 mm (0.079–0.197 in) long with a short tip 2–3 mm (0.079–0.118 in) long. The lower phyllodes, without flowers, are 6–20 mm (0.24–0.79 in) long with a thin, brittle tip 0.5–1.5 mm (0.020–0.059 in) long. There are widely spreading, narrowly triangular to linear stipules 1.0–1.5 mm (0.039–0.059 in) long at the base of the phyllodes. The flowers are borne in heads about 7 mm (0.28 in) in diameter on peduncles 15–25 mm (0.59–0.98 in) long, each head with 25 to 40 yellow flowers. Flowering occurs from March to June and from August to October, and the pods are narrowly oblong, 25–90 mm (0.98–3.54 in) long, 5–7 mm (0.20–0.28 in) wide, thinly leathery and raised over the seeds. The seeds are oblong to elliptic, 4.5–5.5 mm (0.18–0.22 in) long and 3.0–3.5 mm (0.12–0.14 in) wide, mostly dull black with a club-shaped, white aril.

== Taxonomy ==
Acacia dimorpha was first formally described in 2013 by Bruce Maslin, Matthew David Barrett and Russell Lindsay Barrett in the journal Nuytsia from specimens collected in the Edkins Range in the West Kimberley region of Western Australia in 2013. The specific epithet (dimorpha) means 'having two forms', and refers to the clear difference in the size of the phyllodes that occur near the ends of the branchlets and often subtend flowers, and those near to base of the branchlets which do not subtend flowers.

== Distribution and habitat ==
Artesian Range whorled wattle grows in sand over quartzite on slopes, rocky ridges and along seasonal creeks in a small area of the west Kimberley region of northern Western Australia, where it is known from the Edkins and Artesian ranges near the Charnley River. It is a short-lived species that regenerates prolifically following fire.

== Conservation status ==
Acacia dimorpha is listed as "Priority One" by the Government of Western Australia Department of Biodiversity, Conservation and Attractions, meaning that it is known from only one or a few locations that are potentially at risk.

== See also ==
- List of Acacia species
