= Acacia prolata =

Scientific classification
- Kingdom: Plantae
- Clade: Tracheophytes
- Clade: Angiosperms
- Clade: Eudicots
- Clade: Rosids
- Order: Fabales
- Family: Fabaceae
- Subfamily: Caesalpinioideae
- Clade: Mimosoid clade
- Genus: Acacia
- Species: A. prolata

Binomial name
- Acacia prolata Maslin, M.D.Barrett & R.L.Barrett
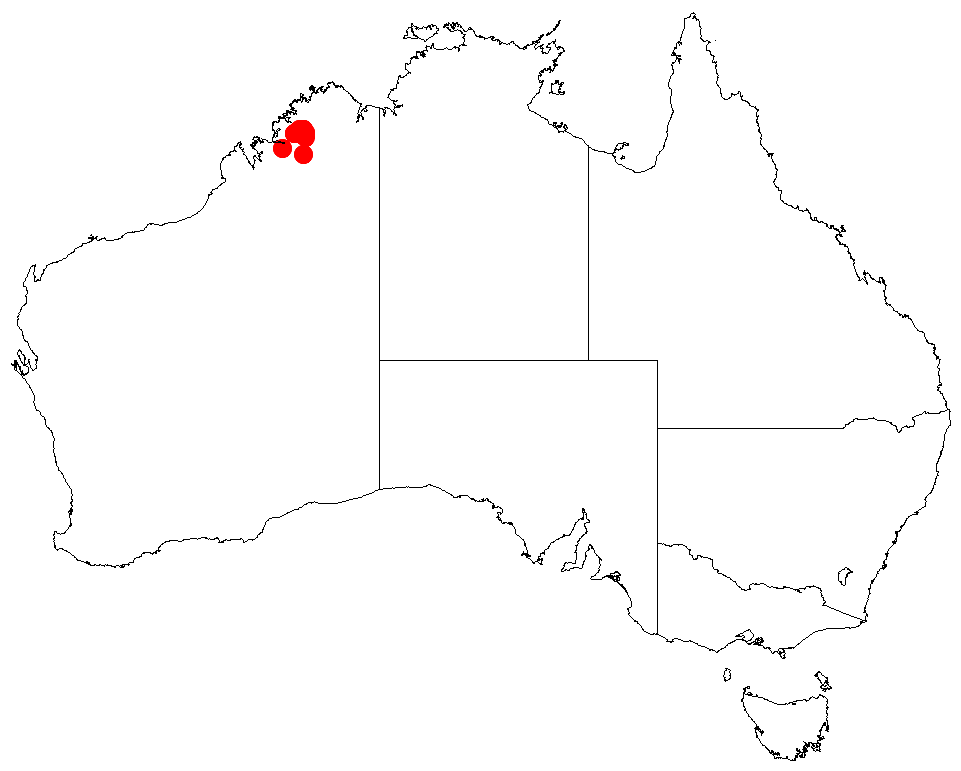
- Occurrence data from AVH

Species of legume

Acacia prolata is a shrub belonging to the genus Acacia and the subgenus Lycopodiifoliae. It is native to an area in the Kimberley region of Western Australia.

== See also ==
- List of Acacia species
