= Gulf Coastal =

Gulf Coastal Northern Territory
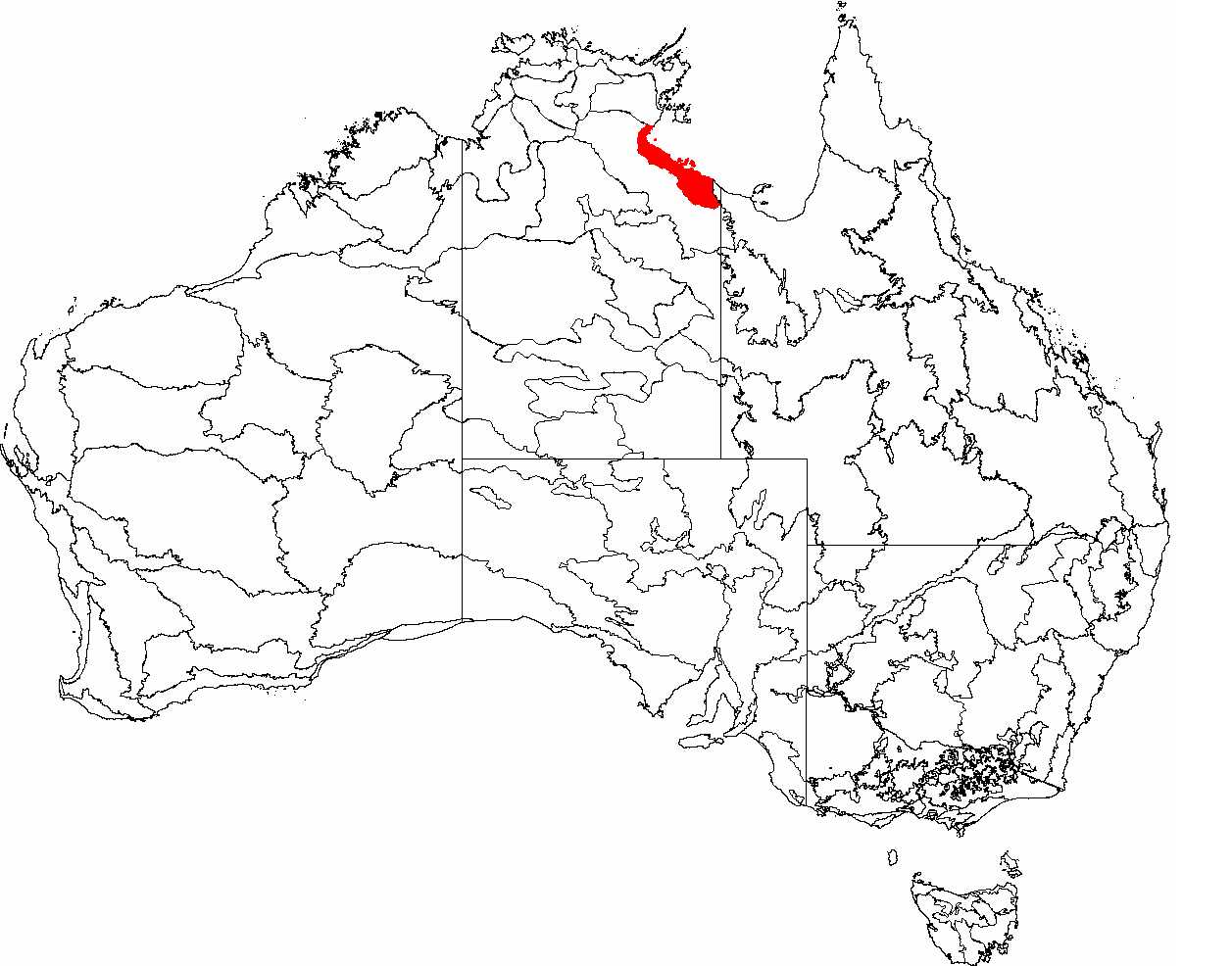
- The interim Australian bioregions, with Gulf Coastal in red
- Area: 27,117.18 km^{2} (10,470.0 sq mi)
Localities around Gulf Coastal:
Gulf Fall and Uplands	Central Arnhem	Gulf of Carpentaria
Gulf Fall and Uplands	Gulf Coastal	Gulf Fall and Uplands
Gulf Fall and Uplands	Gulf Fall and Uplands	Gulf Fall and Uplands

The Gulf Coastal, an interim Australian bioregion, is located in the Northern Territory, comprising 2,711,718 hectares (6,700,800 acres).

The code for the bioregion is GUC.

IBRA regions and subregions: IBRA7
IBRA region / subregion	IBRA code	Area	States	Location in Australia
Gulf Coastal	GUC	2,711,718 hectares (6,700,800 acres)	NT	
Limmen	GUC01	12,714,805 hectares (31,418,970 acres)	NT	
Pellews	GUC02	2,914,114 hectares (7,200,930 acres)	NT	

== See also ==
- Geography of Australia
