= Central Arnhem =

Bioregion in the Northern Territory, Australia

- Region
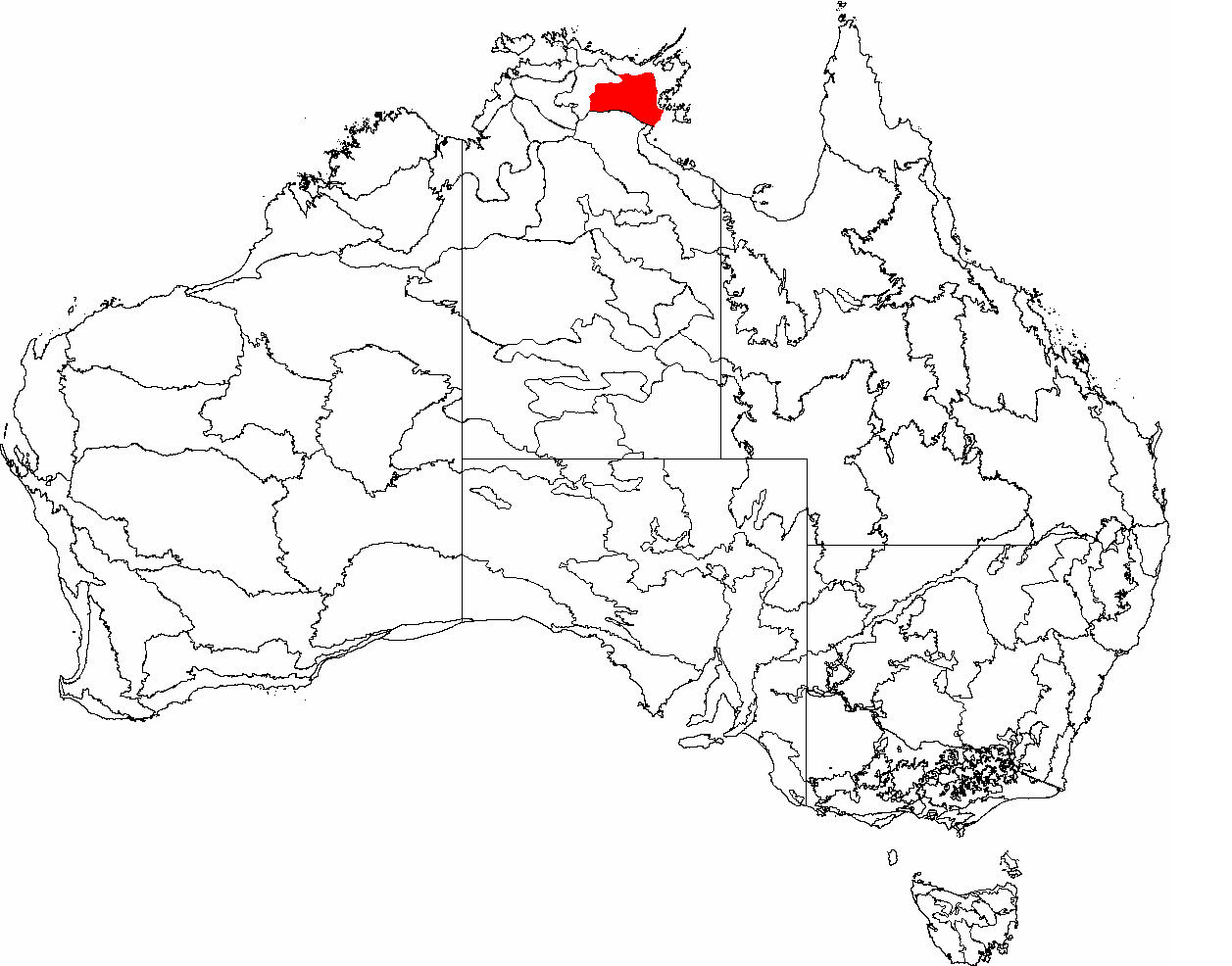
- The interim Australian bioregions, with the Central Arnhem in red
- Country: Australia
- State: Northern Territory

Area
  - Total: 34,604 km^{2} (13,361 sq mi)
Localities around Central Arnhem
Darwin Coastal	Arnhem Coast	Arnhem Coast
Arnhem Plateau	Central Arnhem	Gulf of Carpentaria
Sturt Plateau	Gulf Fall and Upland	Gulf Fall and Upland

The Central Arnhem, an interim Australian bioregion, is located in the Northern Territory, comprising an area of 3,462,433 hectares (8,555,860 acres) of central Arnhem Land in the Top End of the Northern Territory.

The bioregion is characterised by gently sloping terrain with scattered low hills and breakaways. Open forest and woodland vegetation is dominated by Darwin stringybark. Almost all the land is Aboriginal freehold. There are no major industries. The bioregion is sparsely populated, and Numbulwar is the largest community.

== See also ==
- Geography of Australia
