= Gulf Plains =

Gulf Plains Australia
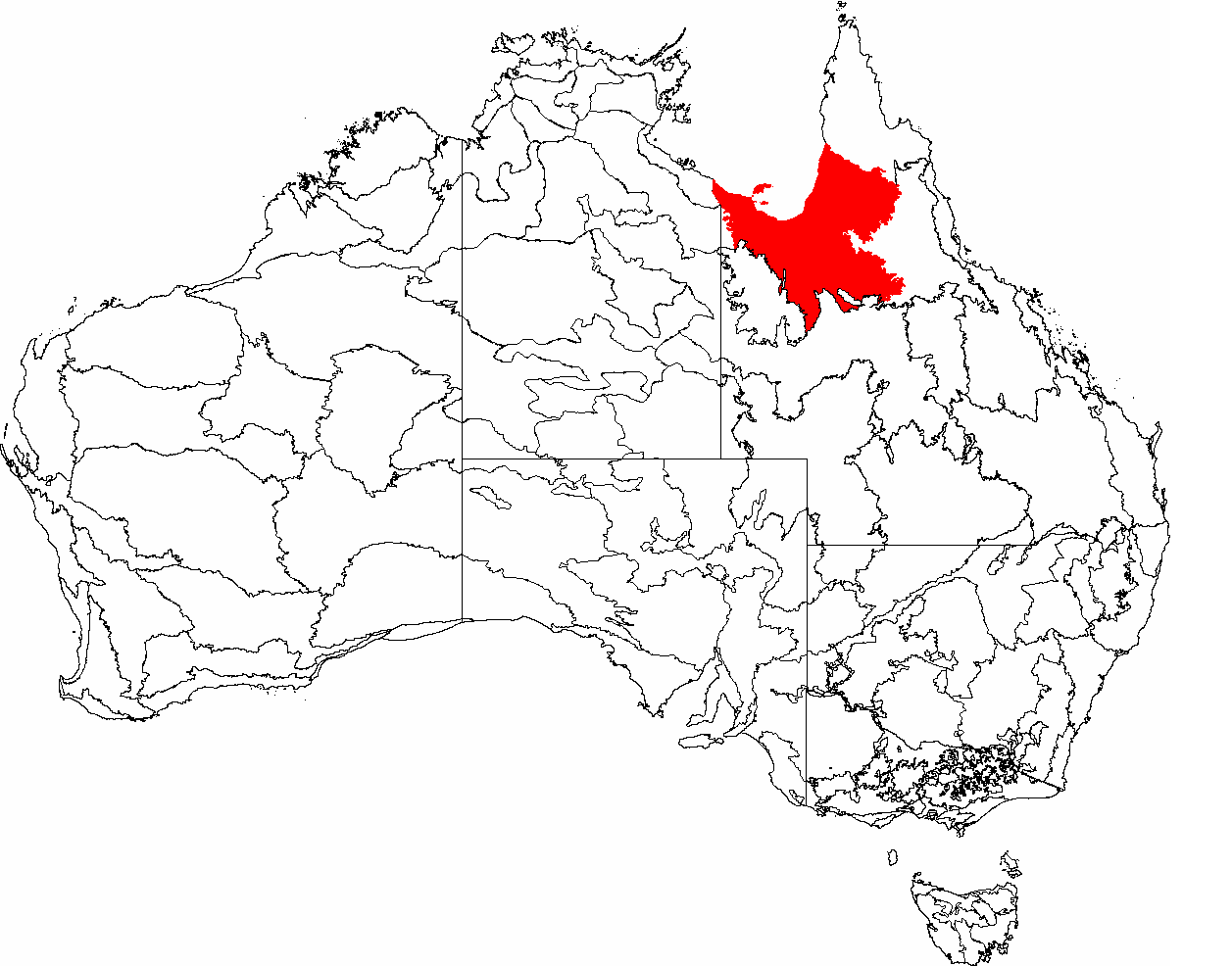
- The interim Australian bioregions, with Gulf Plains in red
- Area: 220,418.25 km^{2} (85,104.0 sq mi)
Localities around Gulf Plains:
Gulf Coastal	Gulf of Carpentaria	Cape York
Gulf Fall and Uplands	Gulf Plains	Einasleigh Uplands
Mount Isa Inlier	Mitchell Grass Downs	Einasleigh Uplands

The Gulf Plains, an interim Australian bioregion (IBRA), is located in the Northern Territory and Queensland, comprising 22,041,825 hectares (54,466,540 acres). It is one of 89 such bioregions defined in Australia, with 419 subregions as of IBRA version 7, compared with the 85 bioregions and 403 subregions described in IBRA6.1.

The code for the bioregion is GUP.

IBRA regions and subregions: IBRA7
IBRA region / subregion	IBRA code	Area	States	Location in Australia
Gulf Plains	GUP	22,041,825 hectares (54,466,540 acres)	NT / Qld	
Karumba Plains	GUP01	1,057,366 hectares (2,612,810 acres)	NT / Qld	
Armraynald Plains	GUP02	1,589,437 hectares (3,927,580 acres)	NT / Qld	
Woondoola Plains	GUP03	2,375,110 hectares (5,869,000 acres)	NT / Qld	
Mitchell-Gilbert Fans	GUP04	5,262,816 hectares (13,004,700 acres)	NT / Qld	
Claraville Plains	GUP05	3,738,013 hectares (9,236,830 acres)	NT / Qld	
Holroyd Plain-Red Plateau	GUP06	2,208,468 hectares (5,457,240 acres)	NT / Qld	
Doomadgee Plains	GUP07	1,831,823 hectares (4,526,530 acres)	NT / Qld	
Donors Plateau	GUP08	2,449,964 hectares (6,053,990 acres)	NT / Qld	
Gilberton Plateau	GUP09	1,403,937 hectares (3,469,200 acres)	NT / Qld	
Wellesley Islands	GUP10	124,893 hectares (308,620 acres)	NT / Qld	

== See also ==
- Geography of Australia
