= Sturt Plateau =

Bioregion in the Northern Territory, Australia

- Region
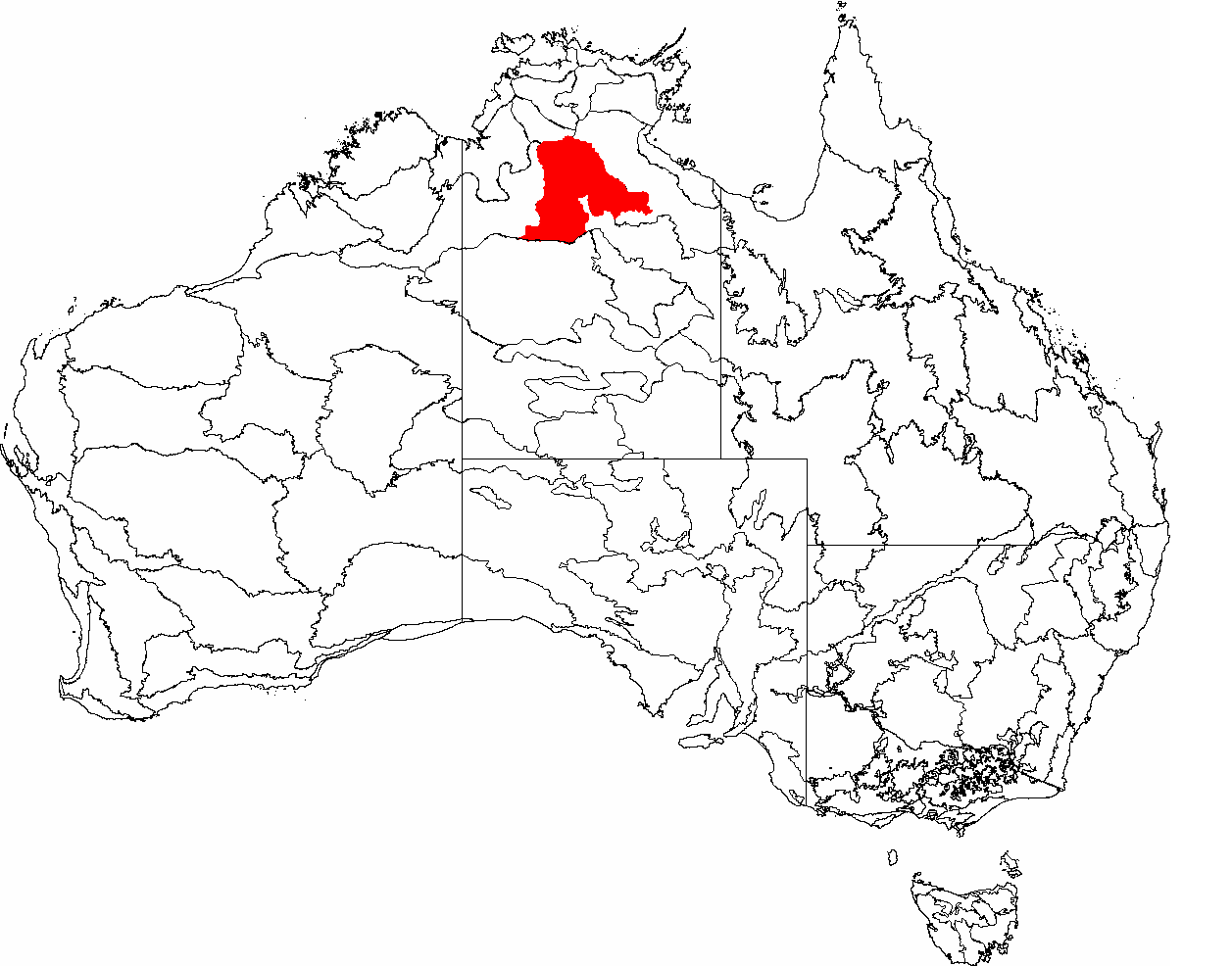
- The interim Australian bioregions, with the Sturt Plateau in red

- Coordinates: 15°37′30″S 132°39′17″E
- Country: Australia
- State: Northern Territory

Area
  - Total: 98,575.31 km^{2} (38,060.14 sq mi)
Localities around Sturt Plateau
Ord Victoria Plain	Daly Basin	Gulf Fall and Upland
Ord Victoria Plain	Sturt Plateau	Gulf Fall and Upland
Tanami	Tanami	Mitchell Grass Downs

The Sturt Plateau, an interim Australian bioregion, is located in the Northern Territory, and covers an area of 9,857,531 hectares (24,358,490 acres). The bioregion has the code STU. There are three subregions.

IBRA regions and subregions: IBRA7
IBRA region / subregion	IBRA code	Area	States	Location in Australia
Sturt Plateau	STU	9,857,531 hectares (24,358,490 acres)	NT	
Renehan	STU01	1,938,959 hectares (4,791,270 acres)	NT	
Newcastle	STU02	4,333,836 hectares (10,709,140 acres)	NT	
Birdum	STU03	3,584,736 hectares (8,858,080 acres)	NT	

== Description ==
The Sturt Plateau bioregion consists of gently undulating plains on lateritised Cretaceous sandstones. Its earths are neutral, sandy, and red and yellow. The vegetation is variable-barked bloodwood woodland with a spinifex understorey.

== See also ==
- Geography of Australia
