= Gulf Fall and Uplands =

Gulf Fall and Uplands Australia
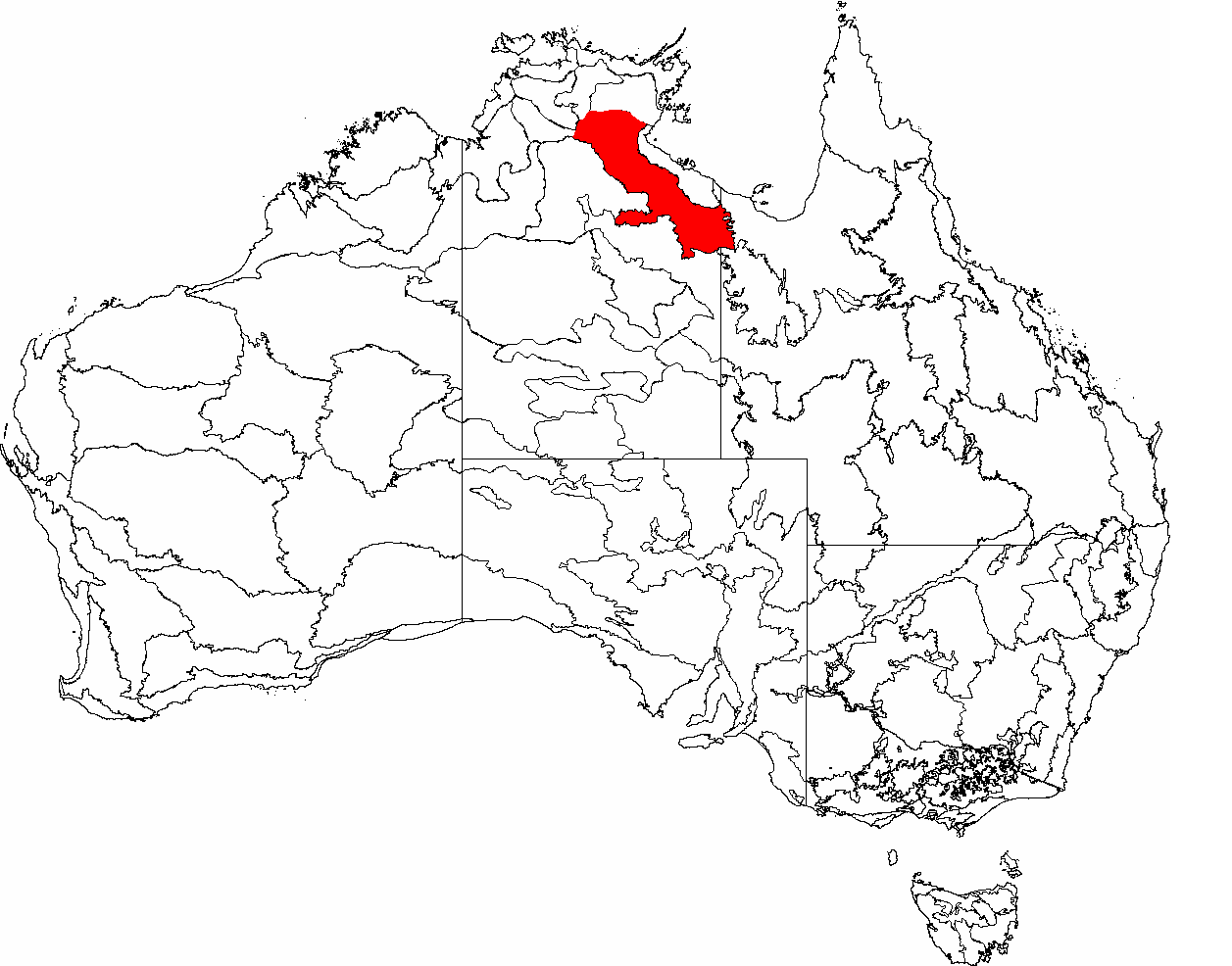
- The interim Australian bioregions, with Gulf Fall and Uplands in red
- Area: 118,479.09 km^{2} (45,745.0 sq mi)
Localities around Gulf Fall and Uplands:
| Arnhem Plateau | Gulf Coastal | Gulf Plains |
| Sturt Plateau | Gulf Fall and Uplands | Gulf Plains |
| Mitchell Grass Downs | Mitchell Grass Downs | Mount Isa Inlier |

The Gulf Fall and Uplands, an interim Australian bioregion, is located in the Northern Territory and Queensland, comprising 11,847,909 hectares (29,276,820 acres).

Described in IBRA5.1 as "undulating terrain with scattered low, steep hills on Proterozoic and Palaeozoic sedimentary rocks, often overlain by lateritised Tertiary material; skeletal soils and shallow sands; Darwin box (Eucalyptus tectifica) and variable-barked bloodwood (Corymbia erythrophloia) woodland to low open woodland with spinifex understorey."

The abbreviation for the bioregion is GFU.

IBRA regions and subregions: IBRA7
| IBRA region / subregion | IBRA code | Area | States | Location in Australia |
|---|---|---|---|---|
| Gulf Fall and Uplands | GFU | 11,847,909 hectares (29,276,820 acres) | NT / Qld | |
| McArthur | GFU01 | 9,330,938 hectares (23,057,250 acres) | NT / Qld | |
| Nicholson | GFU02 | 2,516,971 hectares (6,219,570 acres) | NT / Qld | |

== See also ==
- Geography of Australia
