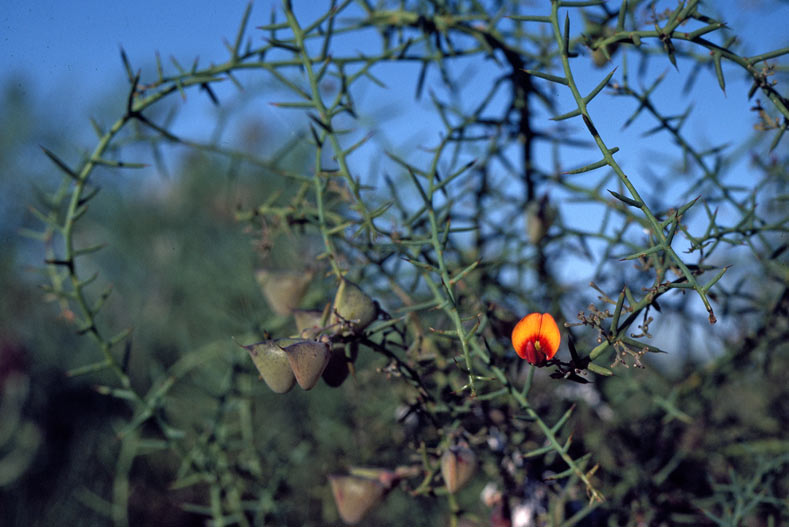
- Near Kalbarri

Scientific classification
- Kingdom: Plantae
- Clade: Tracheophytes
- Clade: Angiosperms
- Clade: Eudicots
- Clade: Rosids
- Order: Fabales
- Family: Fabaceae
- Subfamily: Faboideae
- Genus: Daviesia
- Species: D. ramosissima

Binomial name
- Daviesia ramosissima Crisp

= Daviesia ramosissima =

Species of legume

Daviesia ramosissima is a species of flowering plant in the family Fabaceae and is endemic to the south-west of Western Australia. It is a shrub with many branchlets, scattered, needle-like, sharply pointed phyllodes and orange-yellow and red flowers.

== Description ==
Daviesia ramosissima is a glabrous shrub that typically grows to a height of up to 1.2 m (3 ft 11 in) and has many tangled branchlets. Its phyllodes are scattered, needle-like, 5–43 mm (0.20–1.69 in) long and about 1 mm (0.039 in) wide and sharply pointed. The flowers are arranged in leaf axils in a group of two to eight flowers on a striated peduncle 1.5–4 mm (0.059–0.157 in) long, the rachis 2–11 mm (0.079–0.433 in) long, each flower on a pedicel 2–8 mm (0.079–0.315 in) long with many bracts up to 0.5 mm (0.020 in) long. The sepals are 4–5 mm (0.16–0.20 in) long and joined at the base, the upper two lobes joined for most of their length, the lower three about 0.5 mm (0.020 in) long. The standard petal is broadly egg-shaped with a notched tip, 11.5–12.5 mm (0.45–0.49 in) long, 8–11 mm (0.31–0.43 in) wide, and orange-yellow with a red base. The wings are 10.0–10.5 mm (0.39–0.41 in) long and red, the keel about 9 mm (0.35 in) long. Flowering occurs from July to September and the fruit is an inflated triangular, purplish-grey pod 12–15 mm (0.47–0.59 in) long.

== Taxonomy ==
Daviesia ramosissima was first formally described in 1995 by Michael Crisp in Australian Systematic Botany from specimens collected near the Kalbarri-Ajana road in 1966. The specific epithet (ramosissima) means "very much-branched".

== Distribution and habitat ==
This daviesia grows in kwongan on sandplains from Kalbarri National Park to near Mingenew in the Geraldton Sandplains biogeographic region of south-western Western Australia.

== Conservation status ==
Daviesia ramosissima is listed as "not threatened" by the Government of Western Australia Department of Biodiversity, Conservation and Attractions,
