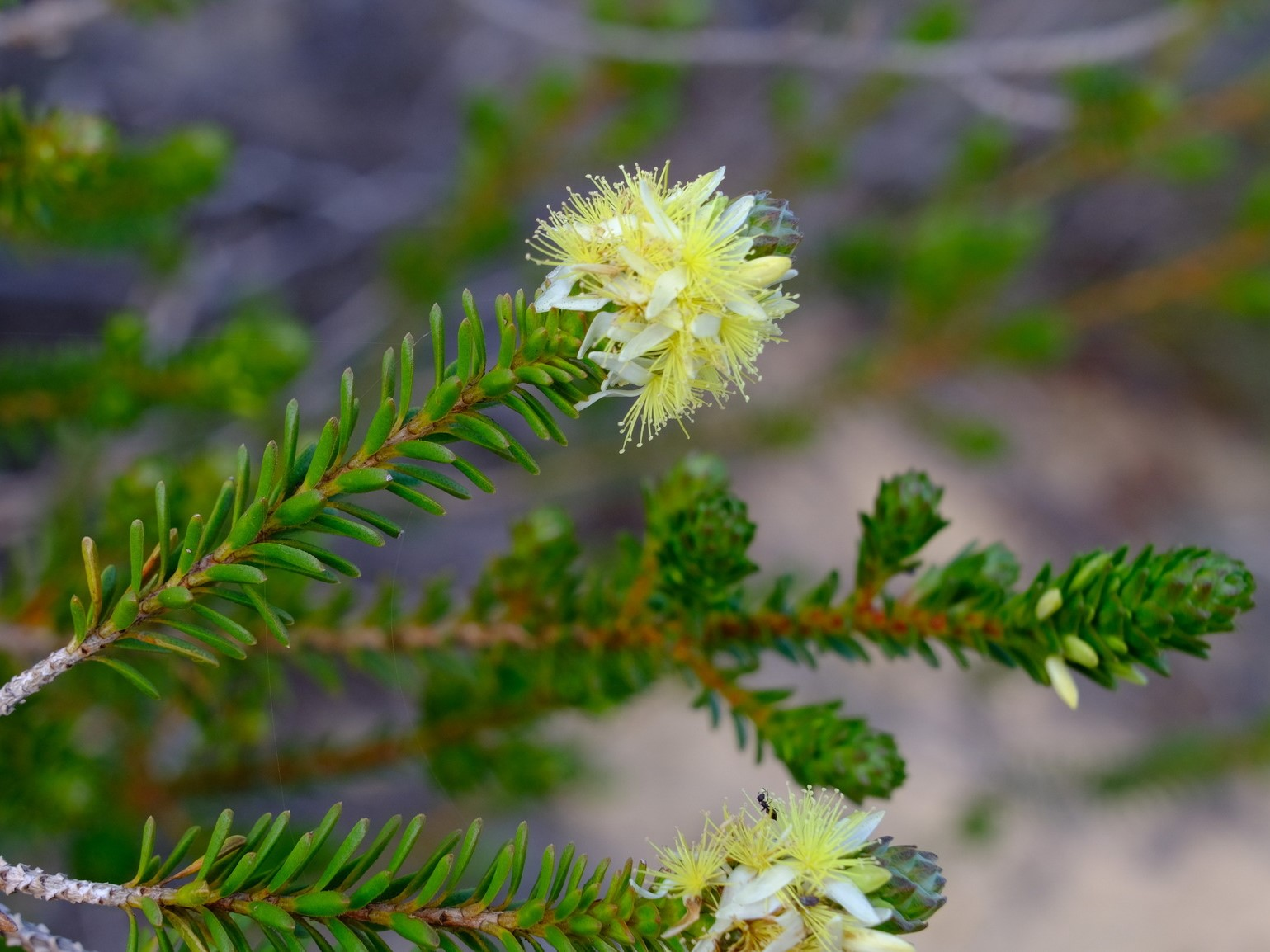

Conservation status
- Priority Three — Poorly Known Taxa (DEC)

Scientific classification
- Kingdom: Plantae
- Clade: Tracheophytes
- Clade: Angiosperms
- Clade: Eudicots
- Clade: Rosids
- Order: Myrtales
- Family: Myrtaceae
- Genus: Calytrix
- Species: C. pimeleoides

Binomial name
- Calytrix pimeleoides C.A.Gardener ex Keighery

= Calytrix pimeleoides =

Species of flowering plant

Calytrix pimeleoides is a species of flowering plant in the myrtle family Myrtaceae and is endemic to the west of Western Australia. It is an erect shrub with overlapping narrowly elliptic to egg-shaped leaves with the narrower end towards the base and yellow flowers with 35 to 50 stamens in several rows.

== Description ==
Calytrix pimeleoides is a slender, erect shrub that typically grows up to 1.4 m (4 ft 7 in) high and wide and has glabrous branchlets. Its leaves are overlapping, narrowly elliptic to egg-shaped with the narrower end towards the base, 7–9 mm (0.28–0.35 in) long and 2–3 mm (0.079–0.118 in) wide on a petiole about 0.5 mm (0.020 in) long. The flowers are borne on a glabrous peduncle 5–6 mm (0.20–0.24 in) long with narrowly egg-shaped lobes 1–2 mm (0.039–0.079 in) long. The floral tube is about 3 mm (0.12 in) long and more or less cylindrical with four ribs. The sepal lobes are absent. The petals are yellow, narrowly elliptic to oblong, 9–10 mm (0.35–0.39 in) long and about 2 mm (0.079 in) wide, and there are about 35 to 50 stamens in several rows. Flowering occurs from August to October.

== Taxonomy ==
Calytrix pimeleoides was first formally described in 2004 by Gregory John Keighery in the journal Nuytsia from specimens collected by Charles Gardner in 1961. The specific epithet (pimeleoides) means 'Pimelea-like', referring to the overlapping leaves of some Pimelea species, such as P. ammocharis and P. argentea.

== Distribution and habitat ==
This species of Calytrix grows on deep yellow sand, usually under Banksia woodland in scattered locations between Kalbarri National Park and Northampton in the Geraldton Sandplains bioregion of Western Australia.

== Conservation status ==
Calytrix pimeleoides is listed as " "Priority Three" by the Government of Western Australia Department of Biodiversity, Conservation and Attractions, meaning that it is poorly known and known from only a few locations but is not under imminent threat.
