= Grey's Spring =

Stone-lined well in Kalbarri, Western Australia

Coordinates: 27°42′46″S 114°10′00″E

Grey's Spring, sometimes called Grey's Well, is a historical site in Kalbarri, Western Australia. It is a stone-lined well dating from after 1848, named after George Grey whose boats were wrecked in the surf of Gantheaume Bay on 1 April 1839, during his second disastrous exploration expedition along the Western Australian coast.

It has a grid cover installed for safety reasons, and a commemorative plaque. It is located in Kalbarri Lions Park, Walker Street, Kalbarri.
