= Bossiaea inundata =

Conservation status
- Priority Two — Poorly Known Taxa (DEC)

Scientific classification
- Kingdom: Plantae
- Clade: Tracheophytes
- Clade: Angiosperms
- Clade: Eudicots
- Clade: Rosids
- Order: Fabales
- Family: Fabaceae
- Subfamily: Faboideae
- Genus: Bossiaea
- Species: B. inundata

Binomial name
- Bossiaea inundata J.H.Ross

Species of legume

Bossiaea inundata is a species of flowering plant in the family Fabaceae and is endemic to the Murchison River Gorge in Western Australia. It is a spreading, openly-branched shrub with oblong, elliptic or egg-shaped leaves with the narrower end towards the base, and deep yellow and red flowers.

== Description ==
Bossiaea inundata is a spreading, openly-branched shrub that typically grows up to a height of up to 1 m (3 ft 3 in) high and has ridged stems and short side shoots ending in a sharp point. The leaves are oblong, elliptic or egg-shaped with the narrower end towards the base, 3–6 mm (0.12–0.24 in) long and 1.2–2.0 mm (0.047–0.079 in) wide on a petiole 0.3–0.9 mm (0.012–0.035 in) long with tapering stipules 0.5–1.0 mm (0.020–0.039 in) long at the base. The flowers are usually arranged singly or in small groups, often on short, spiny side branches, each flower on a pedicel 2–5 mm (0.079–0.197 in) long. There is often only one bracts 0.8–1.1 mm (0.031–0.043 in) long at the base of the pedicel. The five sepals are joined at the base forming a tube 2.3–3.5 mm (0.091–0.138 in) long, the two upper lobes 0.7–1.2 mm (0.028–0.047 in) long and the three lower lobes 0.5–0.8 mm (0.020–0.031 in) long, with an oblong to egg-shaped bracteole 0.6–1.0 mm (0.024–0.039 in) long on the pedicel. The standard petal is deep yellow with a reddish base and 7.8–9.0 mm (0.31–0.35 in) long, the wings 7.0–7.6 mm (0.28–0.30 in) long, and the keel is pinkish-red with a greenish base and 5.2–6.0 mm (0.20–0.24 in) long. Flowering occurs from May to September.

== Taxonomy and naming ==
Bossiaea inundata was first formally described in 2006 by James Henderson Ross in the journal Muelleria from specimens collected in the bed of the Murchison River upstream from the Ross Graham lookout in 1998. The specific epithet (inundata) refers to the habitat of this species that results in the plants sometimes being inundated.

== Distribution and habitat ==
This bossiaea grows in the bed and on the banks of the Murchison River in the Geraldton Sandplains biogeographic region in the west of Western Australia.

== Conservation status ==
Bossiaea inundata is classified as "Priority Two" by the Western Australian Government Department of Parks and Wildlife meaning that it is poorly known and from only one or a few locations.
