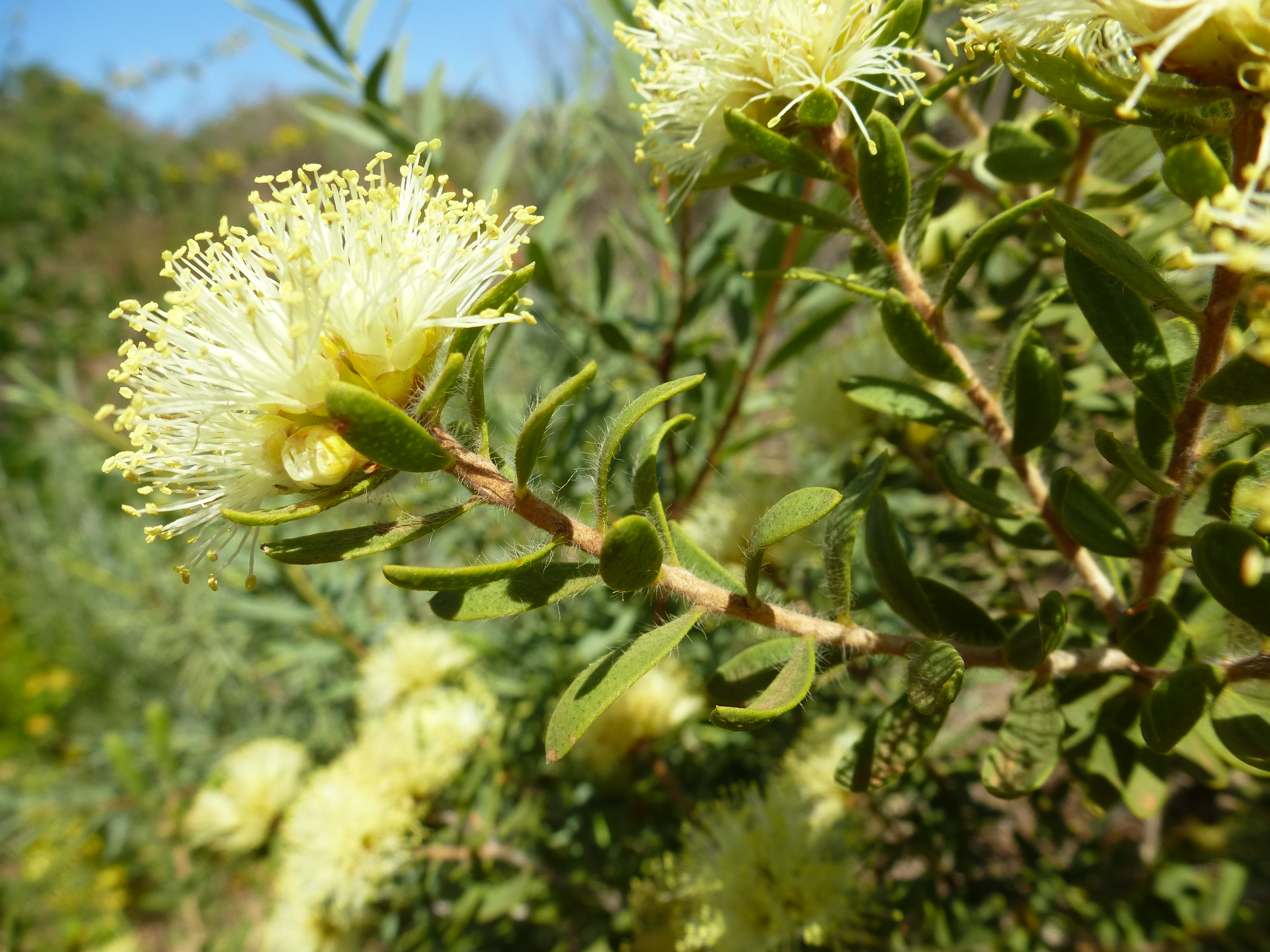

Scientific classification
- Kingdom: Plantae
- Clade: Tracheophytes
- Clade: Angiosperms
- Clade: Eudicots
- Clade: Rosids
- Order: Myrtales
- Family: Myrtaceae
- Genus: Melaleuca
- Species: M. ciliosa

Binomial name
- Melaleuca ciliosa Turcz.

Synonyms
- Myrtoleucodendron ciliosum (Turcz.) Kuntze

= Melaleuca ciliosa =

Species of shrub

Melaleuca ciliosa is a small shrub in the myrtle family, Myrtaceae and is endemic to the south-west of Western Australia. It has bright or pale yellow flowers, an unusual calyx and leaves that are slightly hairy, especially around the edges.

== Description ==
Melaleuca ciliosa is shrub to about 1.0 m (3 ft) high but variable in shape. The leaves are also variable in size, from 4 mm (0.2 in) to 12 mm (0.5 in) long and 2.5 mm (0.1 in) to 6.5 mm (0.3 in) wide. The edges of the leaves are distinctly hairy, there are a few soft hairs on the surface and many prominent oil glands.

The flowers are white or pale yellow and arranged in heads or spikes at or near the ends of the branches which continue to grow after flowering. Each head or spike has 3 to 15 groups of flowers, each group comprising three flowers and up to 23 mm (0.9 in) in diameter. An unusual feature of this melaleuca is that the sepals are joined, forming a continuous ring of thin, dry tissue in a band less than 0.5 mm (0.02 in) wide around the edge of the flower. The petals fall off as the flower opens and the stamens are joined in five bundles around the edge of the flower, each bundle containing 5 to 11 stamens. Flowering usually occurs in October and November. The fruit are woody, cup-shaped to almost spherical capsules, sometimes scattered and sometimes forming tight bundles of fruits up to 2 cm (0.8 in) long.

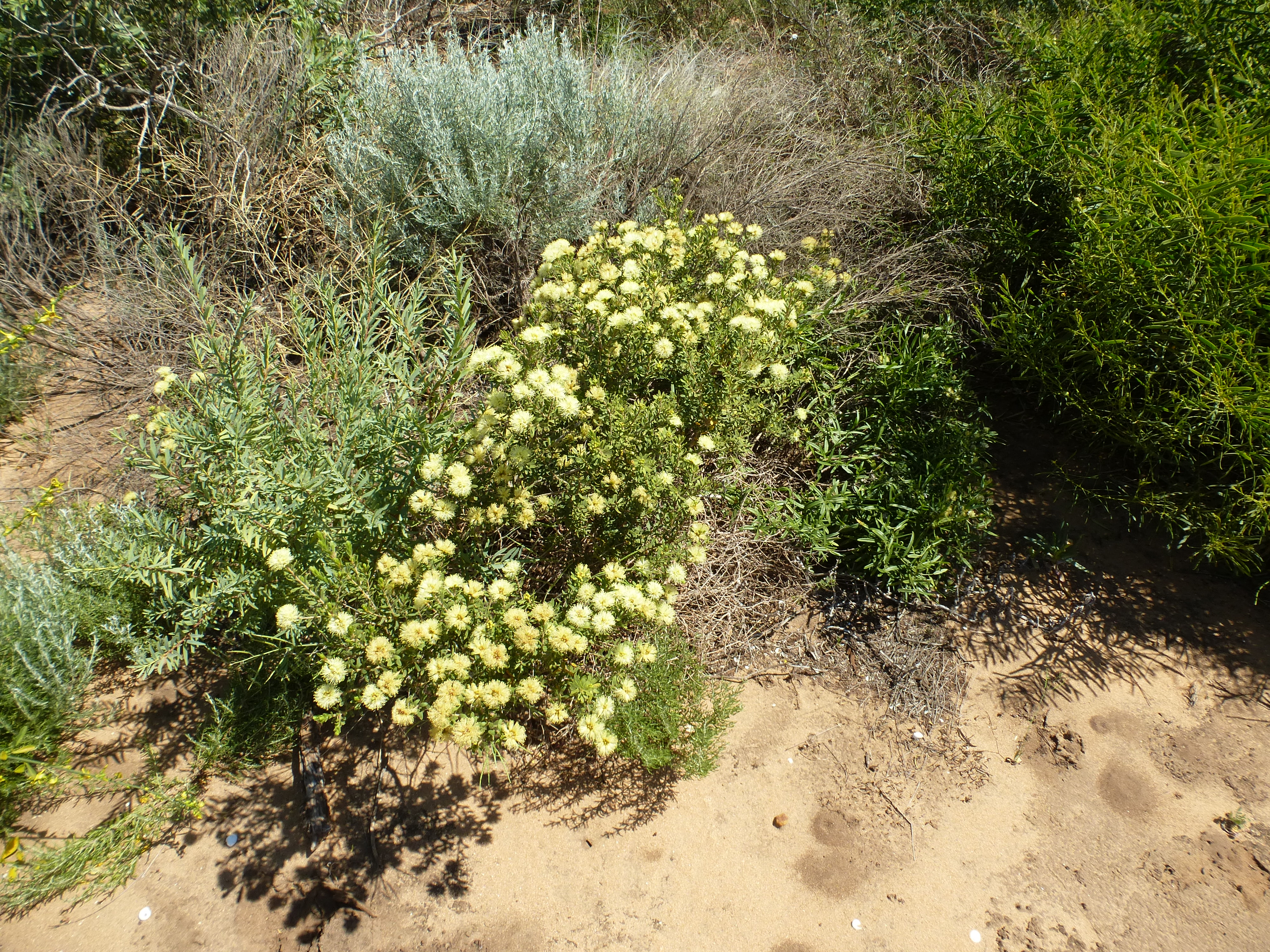
Habit near the Kalbarri lookout.

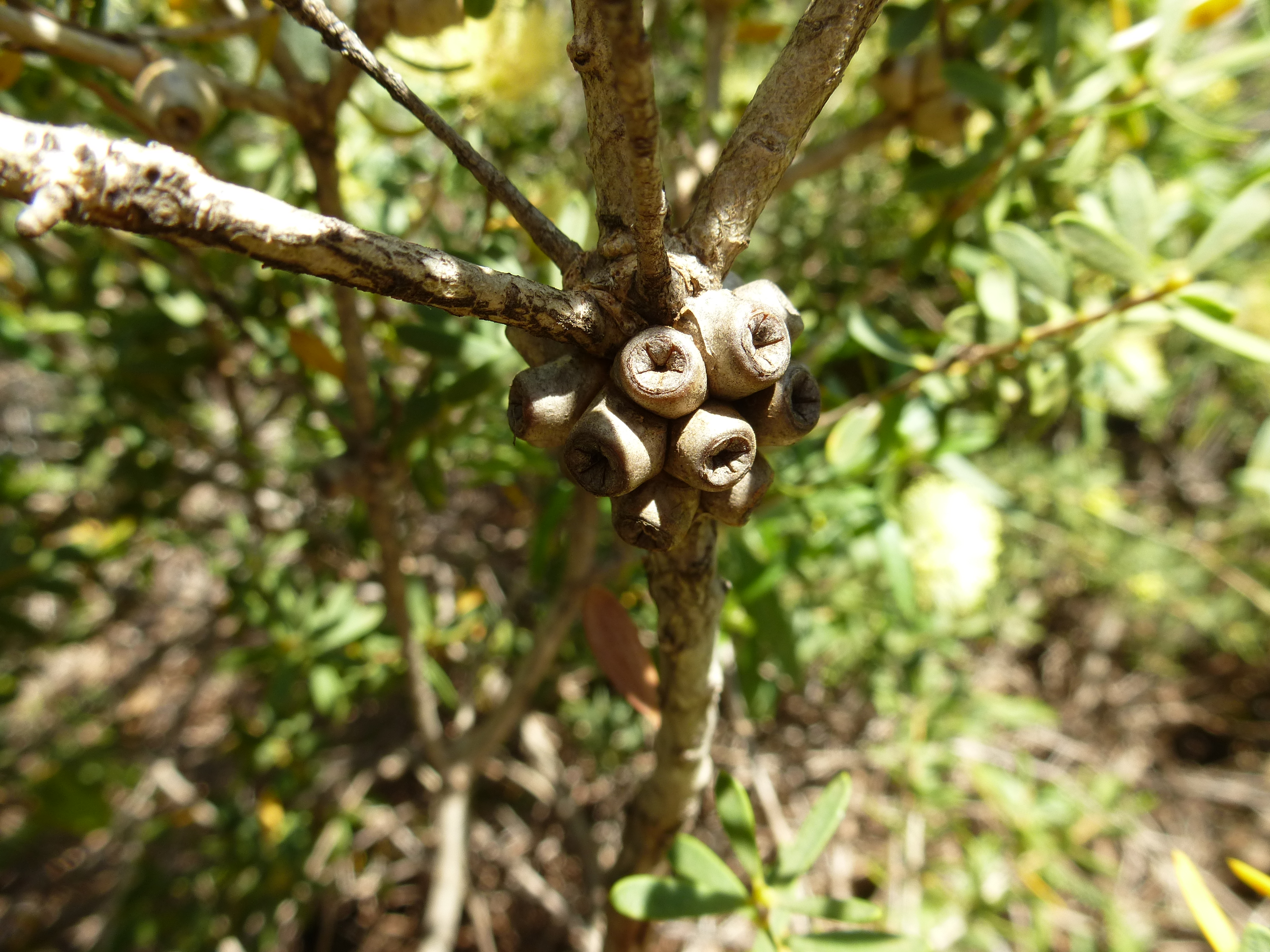
Fruit

== Taxonomy and naming ==
This species was first formally described in 1862 by the Russian botanist Nikolai Turczaninow in Bulletin de la Société Impériale des Naturalistes de Moscou. The specific epithet (ciliosa) is from a Latin word cilium meaning "fine hair", referring to the hairs on the edges of the leaves of this species.

== Distribution and habitat ==
This melaleuca occurs in sand heath between Geraldton and Perth in the Avon Wheatbelt, Geraldton Sandplains, Jarrah Forest and Swan Coastal Plain biogeographic regions. It grows in sand with lateritic gravel in uplands.

== Conservation status ==
Melaleuca ciliosa is listed as not threatened by the Government of Western Australia Department of Parks and Wildlife.

== Use in horticulture ==
This species adapts to a wide range of soils and conditions but prefers a well-drained soil in a sunny position. Regular pruning help to keep the shrub compact.
