= Murchison River Gorge =

Gorge in Western Australia

Coordinates: 27°35′14″S 114°27′20″E

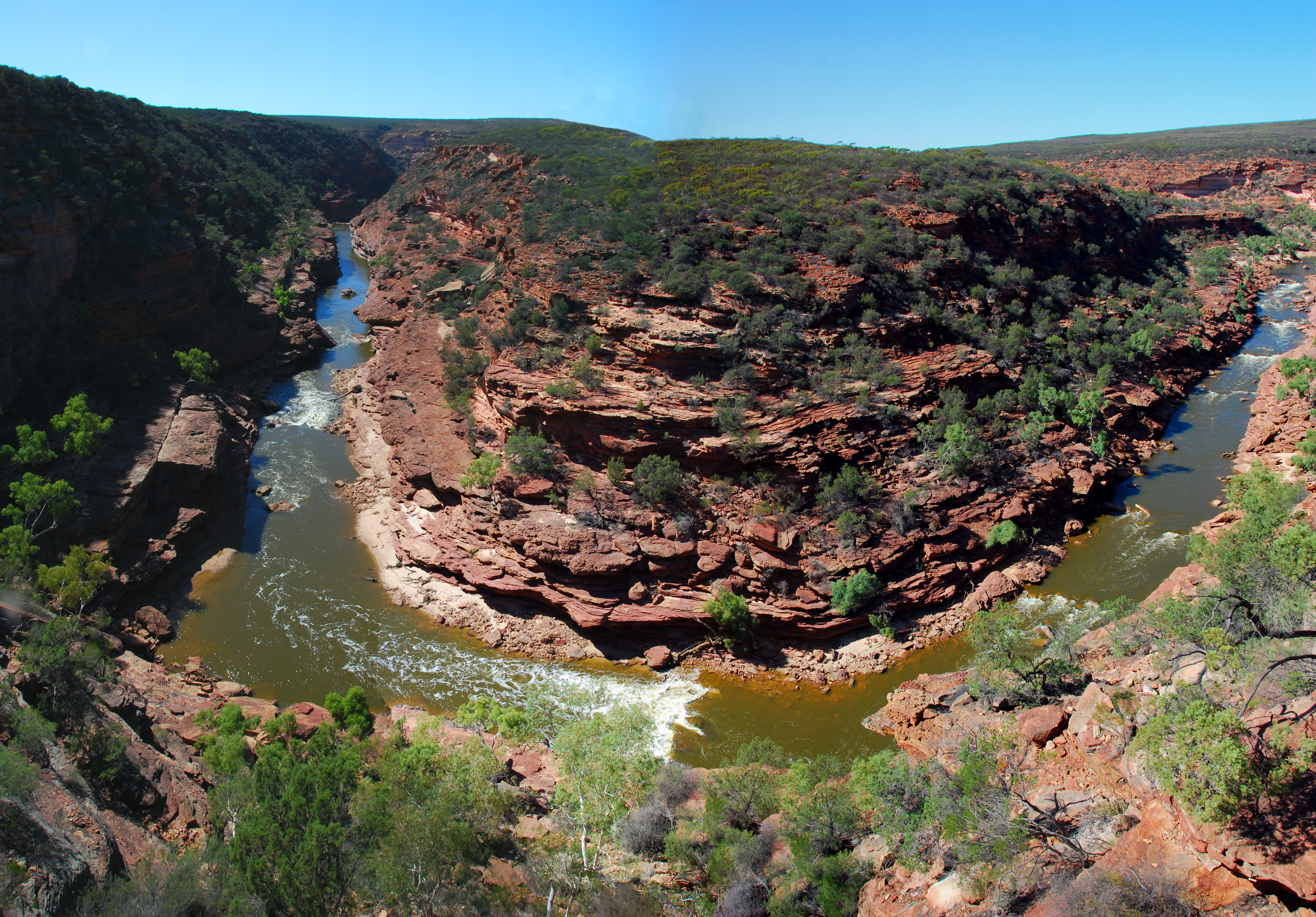
Murchison River Gorge from the Z Bend lookout

Murchison River Gorge is a riverine gorge in Mid West Western Australia. Carved by the meandering lower reaches of the Murchison River, it is more than 80 kilometres (50 mi) long, and up to 129 metres (423 ft) deep. It begins about 13.5 kilometres (8.4 mi) north-northwest of Ajana, and extends to the mouth of the river at Kalbarri.

A site of outstanding natural beauty, it is a major tourist attraction, with points of interest including the Z Bend lookout and The Loop walking trail. The gorge is also of interest to geologists, with exposures of Tumblagooda sandstone, an Ordovician redbed formation that contains fossils of eurypterids, representing some of the earlier fossil evidence of land animals. Fossilised eurypterid tracks are common in the vicinity of the gorge, as are tracks of other arthropods, possibly trilobites.

The gorge is considered to be in excellent condition and lies almost entirely within the Kalbarri National Park. It was nominated in 1991 as a geological monument for the Register of the National Estate.
