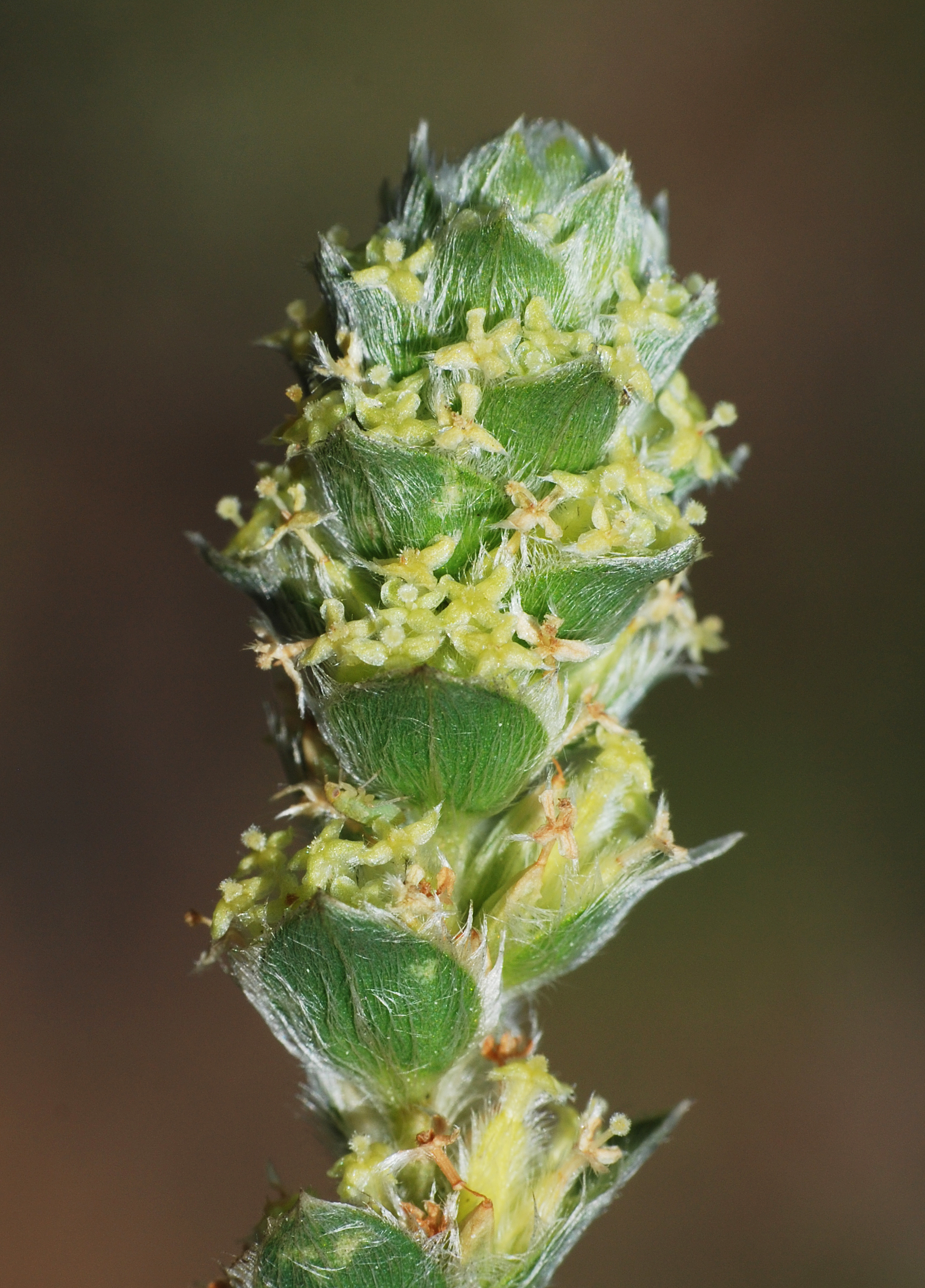
- Female flowers

Scientific classification
- Kingdom: Plantae
- Clade: Tracheophytes
- Clade: Angiosperms
- Clade: Eudicots
- Clade: Rosids
- Order: Malvales
- Family: Thymelaeaceae
- Genus: Pimelea
- Species: P. argentea

Binomial name
- Pimelea argentea R.Br.

Synonyms
- List: Banksia argentea (R.Br.) Kuntze; Calyptrostegia argentea (R.Br.) C.A.Mey.; Calyptrostegia myriantha (Meisn.) Endl.; Pimelea argentea R.Br. var. argentea; Pimelea argentea var. racemosa F.Muell.; Pimelea myriantha Meisn.; Pimelea shuttleworthiana Meisn.; Pimelea vestita Meisn.

= Pimelea argentea =

Narrow leaved pimelea

Species of shrub

Pimelea argentea, commonly known as silvery leaved pimelea, is a species of flowering plant in the family Thymelaeaceae and is endemic to the south-west of Western Australia. It is an erect shrub with densely hairy young stems and leaves, the leaves linear to elliptic, and heads of white to yellow or greenish flowers, the male and female flowers on separate plants.

== Description ==
Pimelea argentea is an erect shrub that typically grows to a height of 0.4–1.8 m (1 ft 4 in – 5 ft 11 in) and has densely hairy young stems and leaves. The leaves are pale green or silvery, linear to more or less elliptic, 4–47 mm (0.16–1.85 in) long and 2–10 mm (0.079–0.394 in) wide and usually sessile. Male and female flowers are white to yellow or greenish, and borne on separate plants. Male flowers have a floral tube 3.0–5.5 mm (0.12–0.22 in) long, the sepals hairy on the outside and 1.5–2.0 mm (0.059–0.079 in) long, the stamens about the same length as the sepals. The floral tube of female flowers is 2.5–5.0 mm (0.098–0.197 in) long, the sepals 1.0–1.5 mm (0.039–0.059 in) long and hairy on the outside, the style 0.5–2 mm (0.020–0.079 in) long and protruding.

== Taxonomy and naming ==
Pimelea argentea was first formally described in 1810 by Robert Brown in his book Prodromus Florae Novae Hollandiae et Insulae Van Diemen. The specific epithet (argentea) means "silvery".

== Distribution and habitat ==
Silvery leaved pimelea mostly grows in sand and is found on coastal dunes and in rocky granite areas from the Murchison River to Israelite Bay and inland as far as Hyden.

== Conservation status ==
Pimelea argentea is listed as "not threatened" by the Government of Western Australia Department of Biodiversity, Conservation and Attractions.
