= Z Bend =

Section of the Murchison River in Western Australia

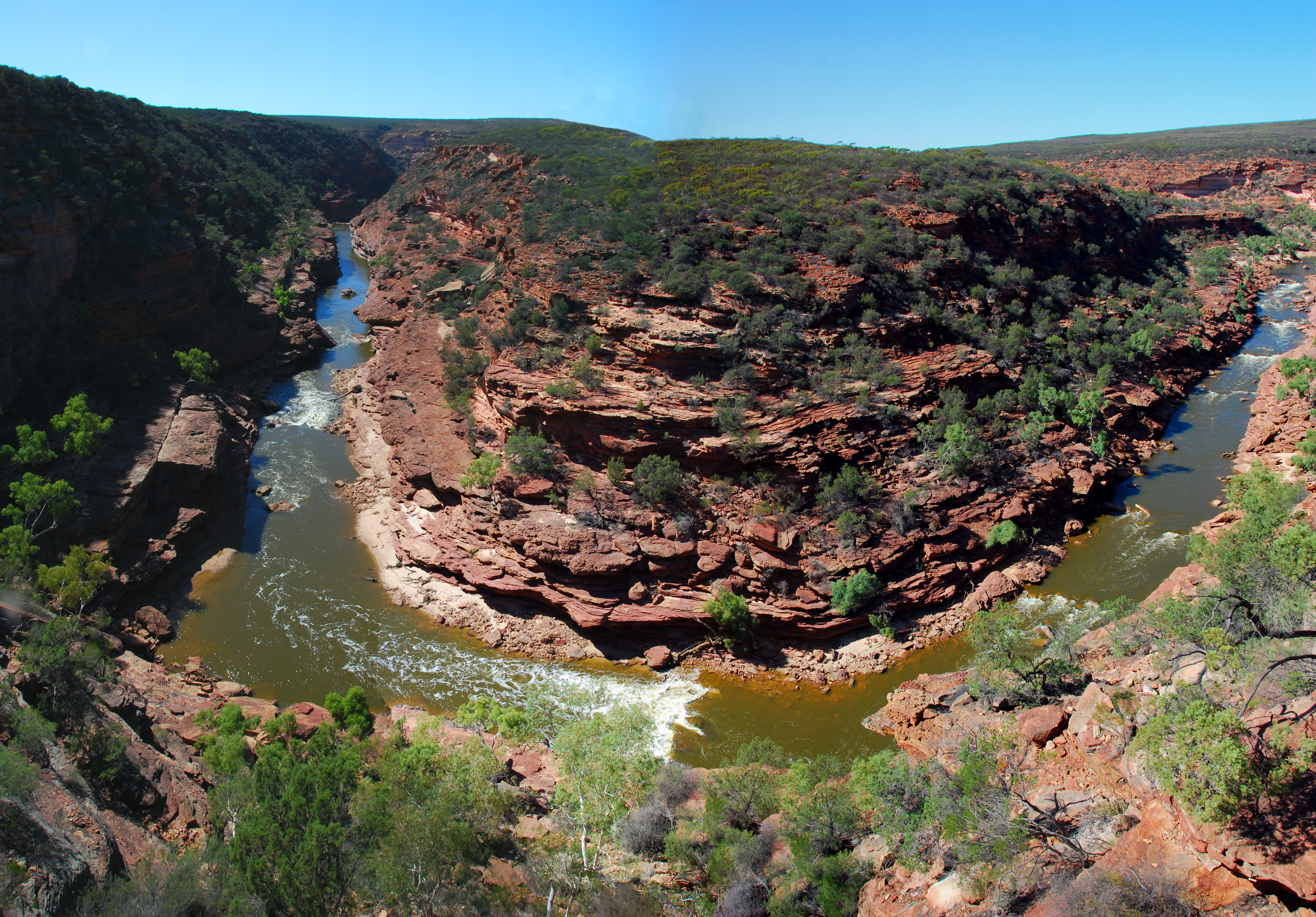
View of Murchison River Gorge from the Z Bend lookout.

The Z Bend lookout is a popular tourist lookout on the Murchison River Gorge in Western Australia. It is located at 27°39′19″S 114°27′19″E, about 30 kilometres (19 mi) east of Kalbarri, in the Kalbarri National Park. One of four lookouts in the national park, it is situated on a sharp bend in the gorge. The view includes an excellent section through the Tumblagooda Sandstone, a geological sequence of fluvial and coastal deposits over one kilometre (0.62 mi) deep.

== Facilities ==
Picnic seating and toilets are situated next to the car park. From the car park there is a walk of about 500 metres (1,600 ft) to the gorge lookout. There is then a climb of about 50 metres (160 ft) to the bed of the Murchison River.
