= Kalbarri National Park =

National Park in Western Australia

- IUCN category II (national park)
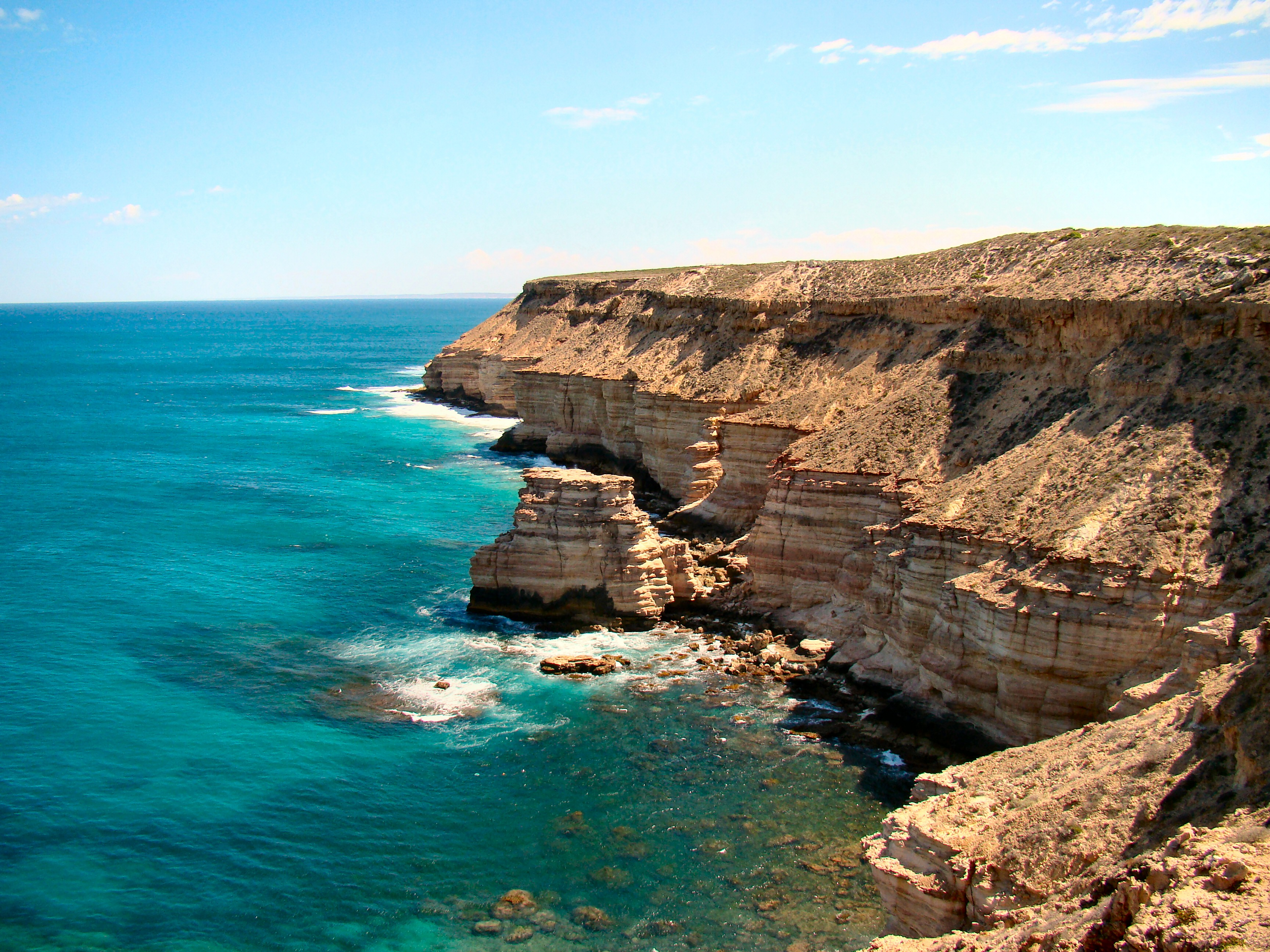
- From the coastal section of the park, cliffs running south from the town of Kalbarri

- Location within Western Australia
- Location: Western Australia
- Nearest city: Kalbarri
- Coordinates: 27°47′05″S 114°14′45″E
- Area: 1,830.05 km^{2} (706.59 sq mi)
- Established: 1963
- Governing body: Department of Parks and Wildlife (DPaW)
- Website: https://exploreparks.dbca.wa.gov.au/park/kalbarri-national-park

Kalbarri National Park is located 485 kilometres (301 mi) north of Perth, in the Mid West region of Western Australia.

The major geographical features of the park include the Murchison River gorge which runs for nearly 80 kilometres (50 mi) on the lower reaches of the Murchison River. Spectacular coastal cliffs are located on the coast near the mouth of the Murchison River and the town of Kalbarri.

There is also an eponymous locality of the Shire of Northampton, but the boundaries of the national park and the locality are not identical.

== Geography ==
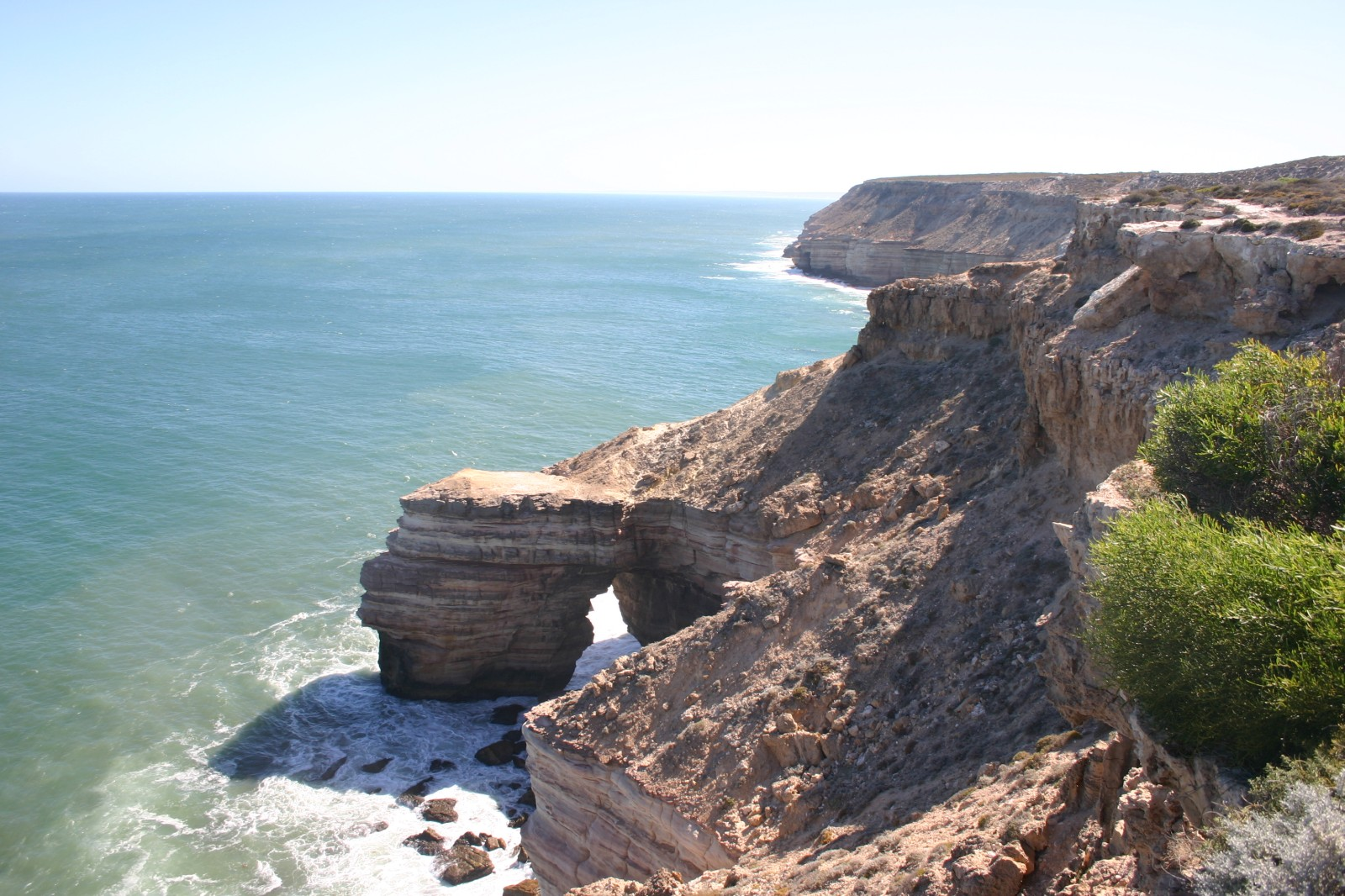
Natural bridge

Kalbarri National Park preserves the inland desert regions of red and white striped Tumblagooda sandstone east of the town of Kalbarri, particularly the lower reaches of the Murchison River and its gorge, as well as the mouth of the river by Meanarra Hill.

The western edge of the park protects the coastline south of the town which features cliffs more than 100 metres (328 ft) high. The coastal area contains several wind and water eroded rock formations including a sea stack and a natural bridge.

== Climate ==
The park is open all year round though temperatures can be extremely high from December through April. The park lies in the northernmost limits of the transition zone between a Mediterranean and a semi-arid climate. Winters are warm with moderate precipitation. Summers are hot and dry with temperatures that frequently exceed 40 °C (104 °F) in the inland part of the park. Inland areas can often be more than 10 °C (18 °F) higher than along the coast and in town. Monthly precipitation levels are low with most rain falling from May through August. Heavy rainfalls may cause the roads to the gorge to be closed.

== Flora ==
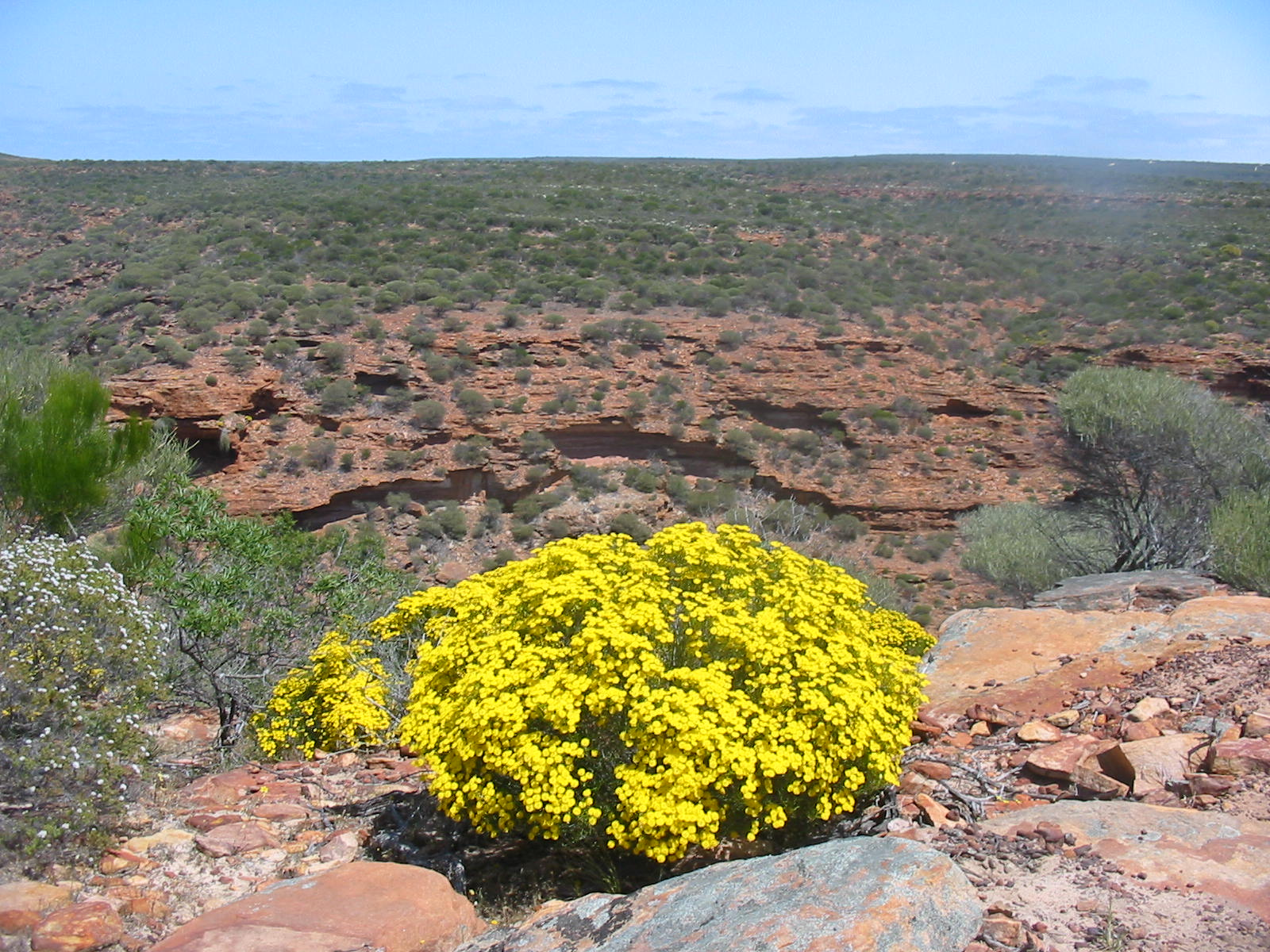
Verticordia chrysantha

The Kalbarri area is known for its diversity and extent of wildflowers. More than 800 species of wildflowers bloom from late winter through early summer with peak times in August and September. Twenty-one plant species are found only in the coastal cliff tops and gorge country predominantly in the National Park. One of the best known local plants is the Kalbarri catspaw, a small yellow or red plant that is usually seen on recently burnt country from August to September. Several orchids can only be seen in and near the park, including the Kalbarri spider orchid and the Murchison hammer orchid.

The small-petalled Beyeria or short-petalled Beyeria, once thought to be extinct, was re-discovered in the park in 1994. The population in the park is one of only three known populations.

== Fauna ==
The park area has observation records for about 200 different animal species in the interior of the park along the Murchison River. More than 400 species have been recorded near the coast and around the town of Kalbarri. The threatened tammar wallaby was observed previously in the area but not lately.

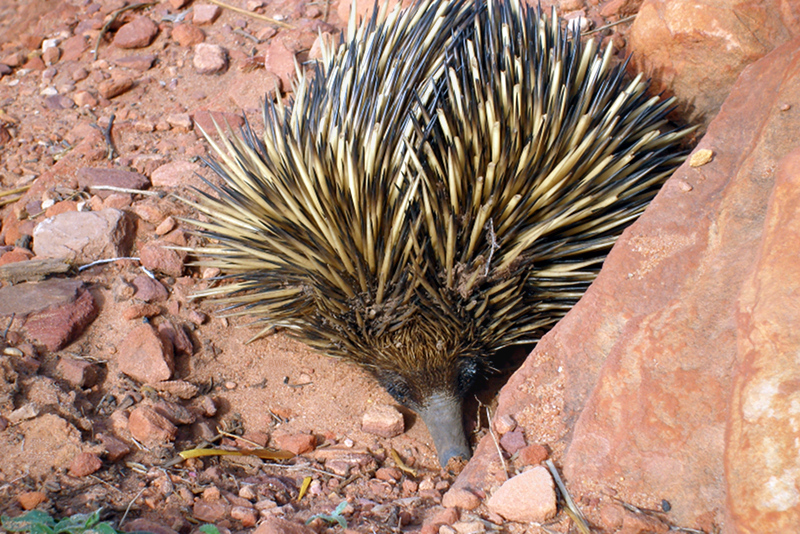
A short-beaked echidna found on the trail to Nature's Window

Approximately 150 bird species have been observed including the emu, osprey, wedge-tailed eagle and Australian pelican. Some of the recorded mammal species in the interior include the western grey kangaroo, short-beaked echidna and spinifex hopping mouse. The only observed bat in the park is the Finlayson's cave bat. Recorded reptile species include the thorny devil, western bearded dragon and central netted dragon. The only observed amphibian is Günther's toadlet. About 30 different arthropods have been recorded including the Pilbara tiger dragonfly (Ictinogomphus dobsoni) and the savanna black tree ant (Tetraponera punctulata).

== Activities ==
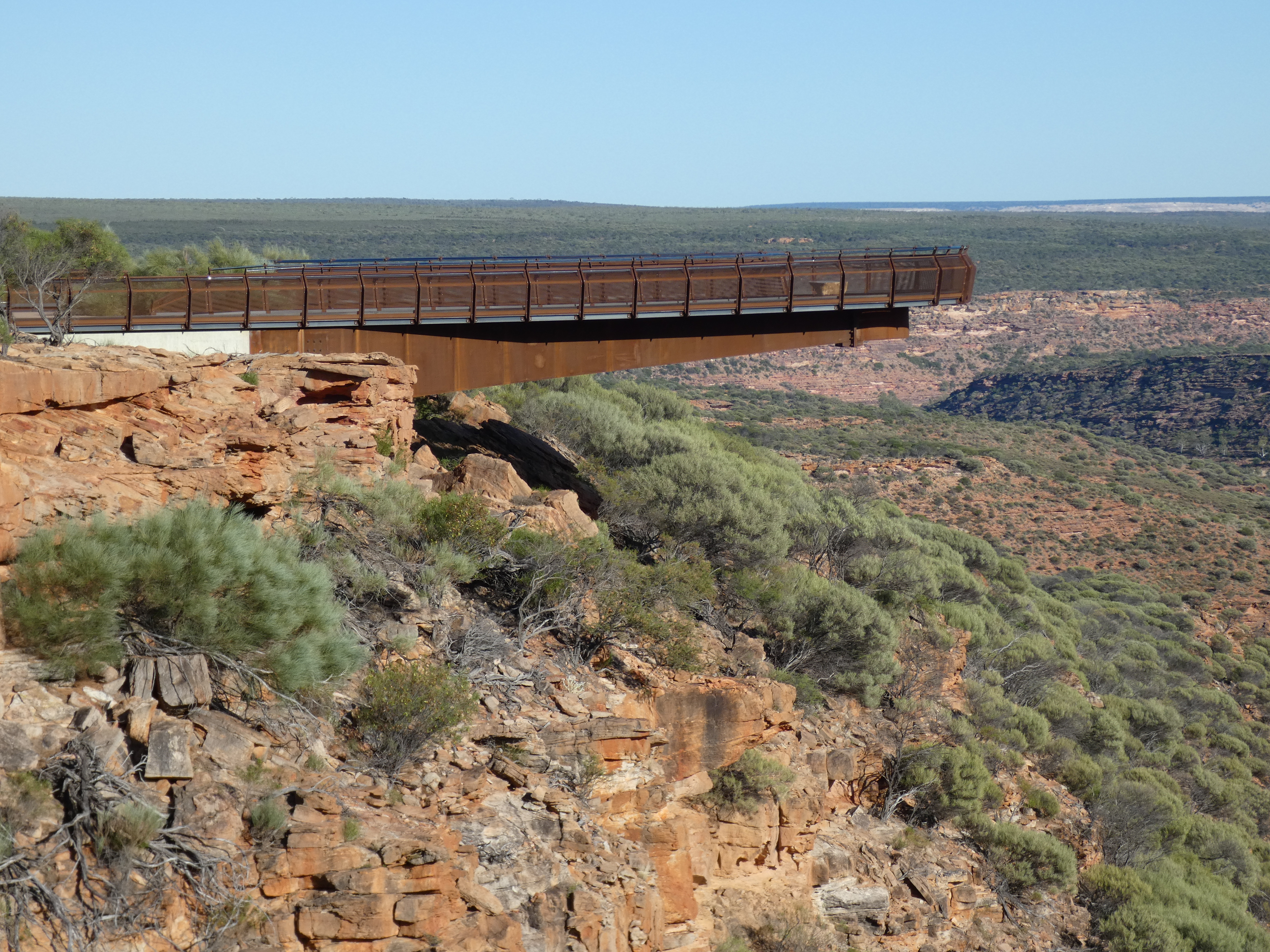
Kalbarri Skywalk Platform over the Murchison River Gorge

The most popular activities are sightseeing, boating, fishing, picnicking and bushwalking. Other activities include abseiling in the gorge and horseback riding, as well as scuba diving, snorkelling, surfing and swimming in the Indian Ocean at Red Bluff Beach and the small beach at Pot Alley. From Kalbarri there are scenic cruises along the Murchison River and flights over Kalbarri National Park. Construction of the two Kalbarri Skywalk platforms are now completed and offer expansive views of the Murchison River Gorge and Kalbarri National Park.

== Facilities ==
There are no campsites or other accommodations and no water available within the park boundaries. All overnight visitors must use the facilities in the town unless they are on a multi-day bushwalk or boat tour.

== Features ==
Coastal part, starting from the town of Kalbarri and moving south:

- Red Bluff
- Mushroom Rock
- Rainbow Valley
- Pot Alley
- Eagle Gorge
- Shellhouse and Grandstand
- Island Rock
- Natural Bridge

Inland part, along the Murchison River Gorge:

- Nature's Window
- The Loop
- Z Bend
- Hawks Head
- Ross Graham Lookout

== Galleries ==
Landscapes
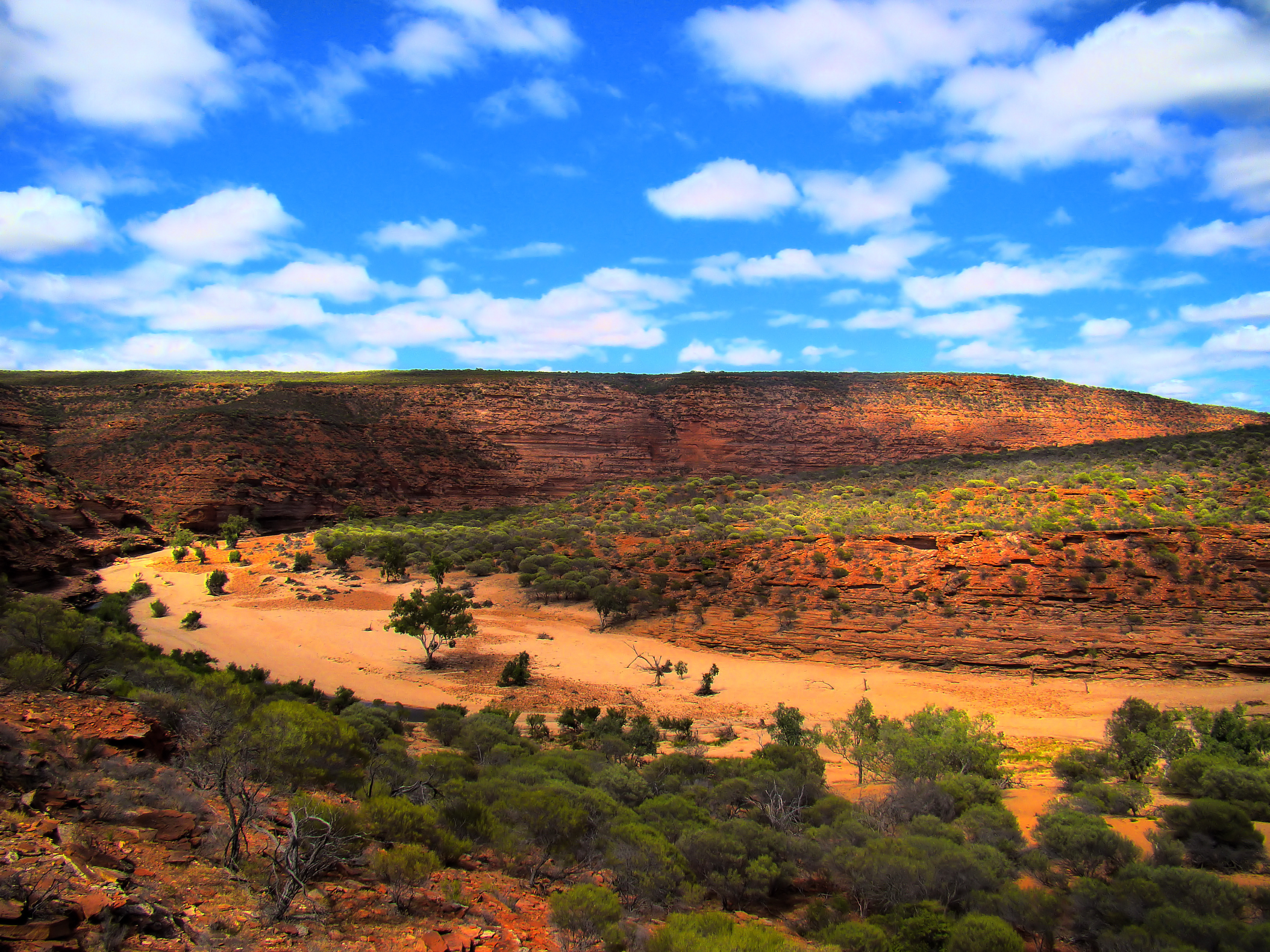
The Loop, a long meander

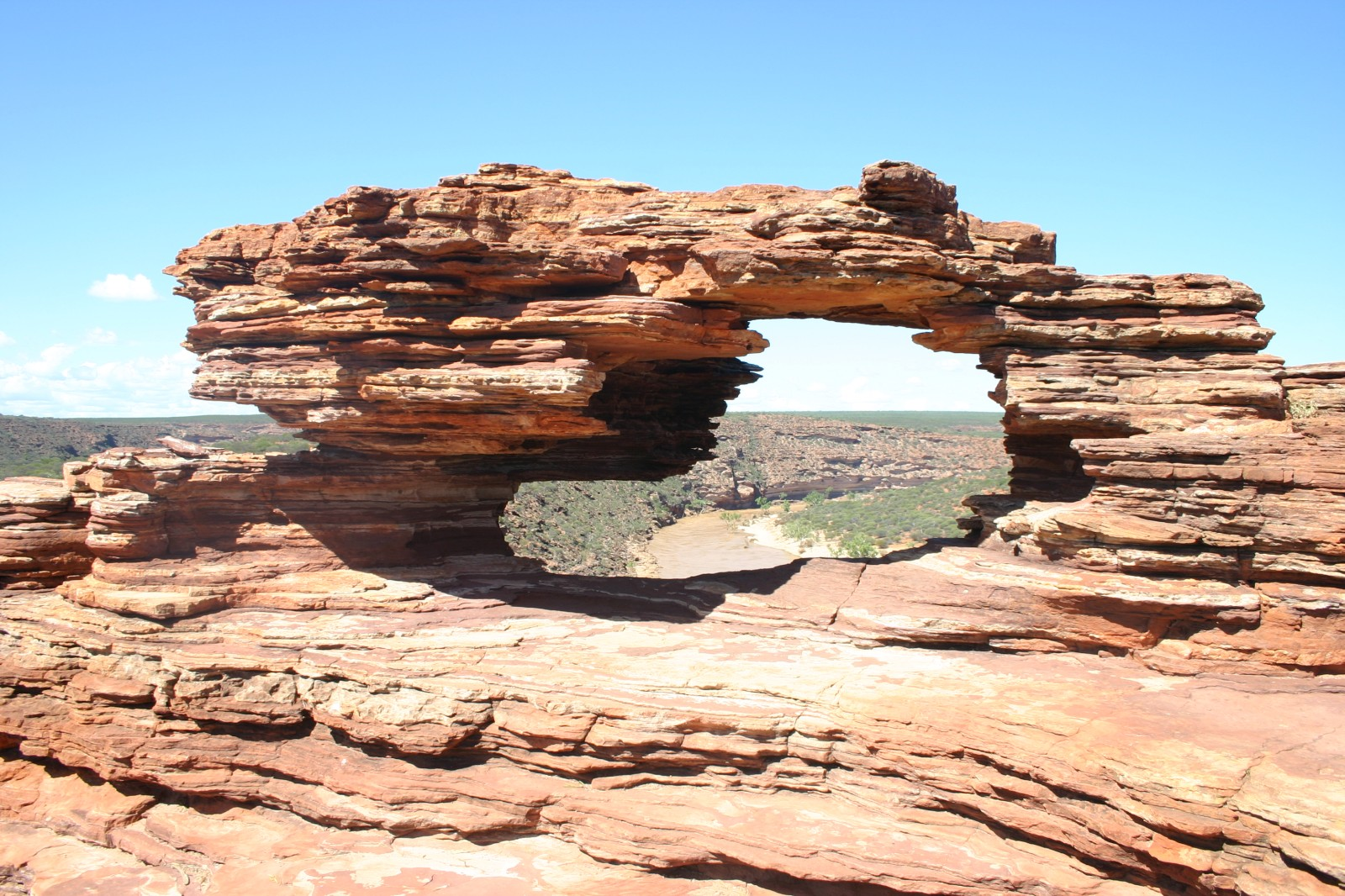
Nature's Window, a rock arch

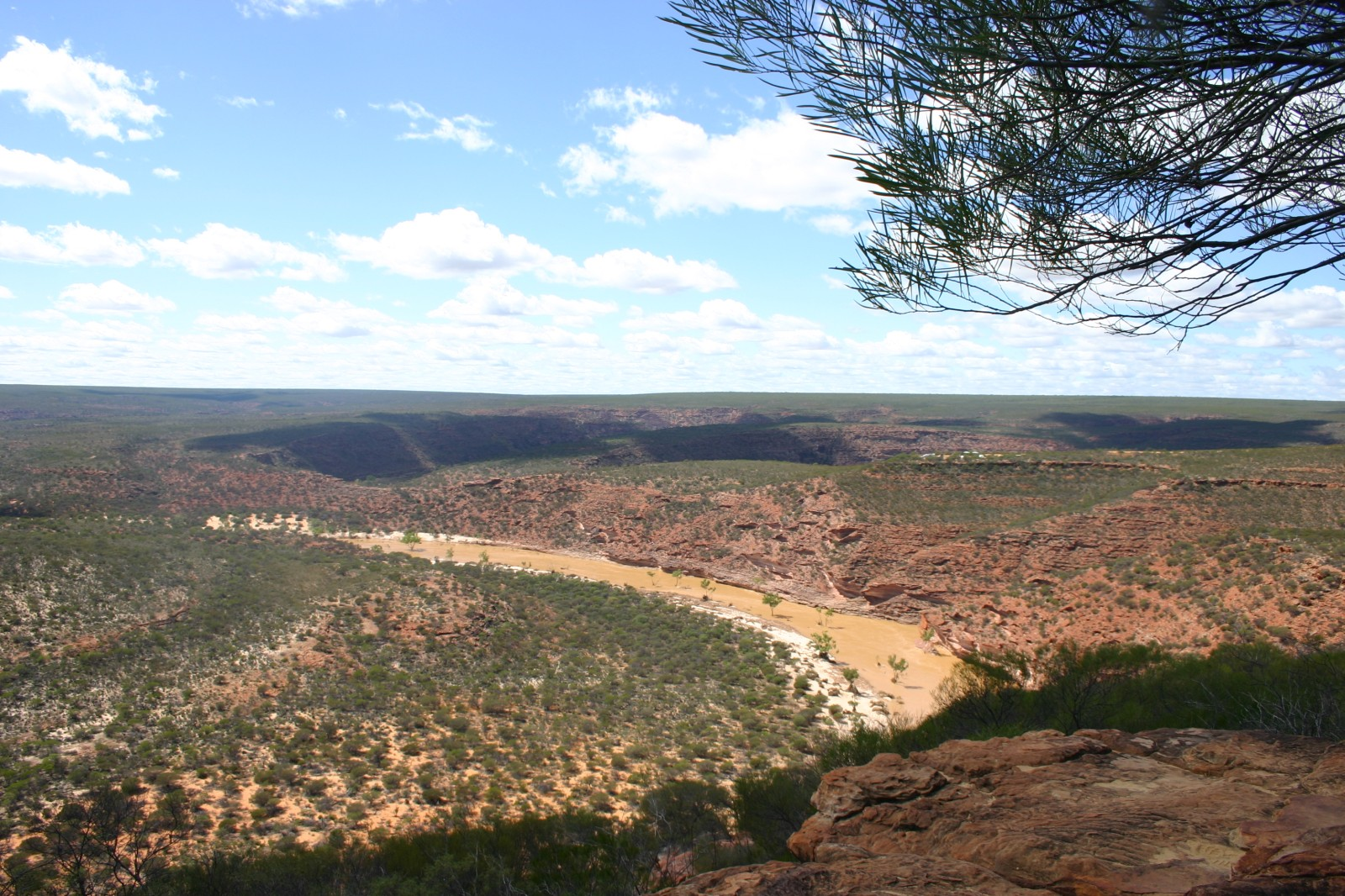
Murchison River gorge

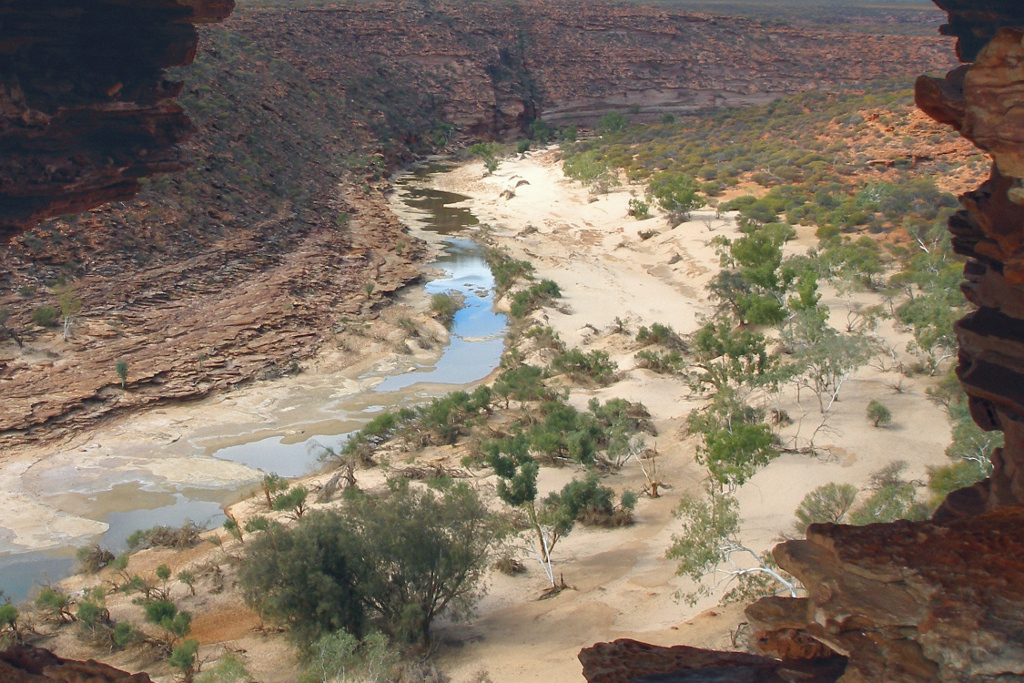
View through Nature's Window

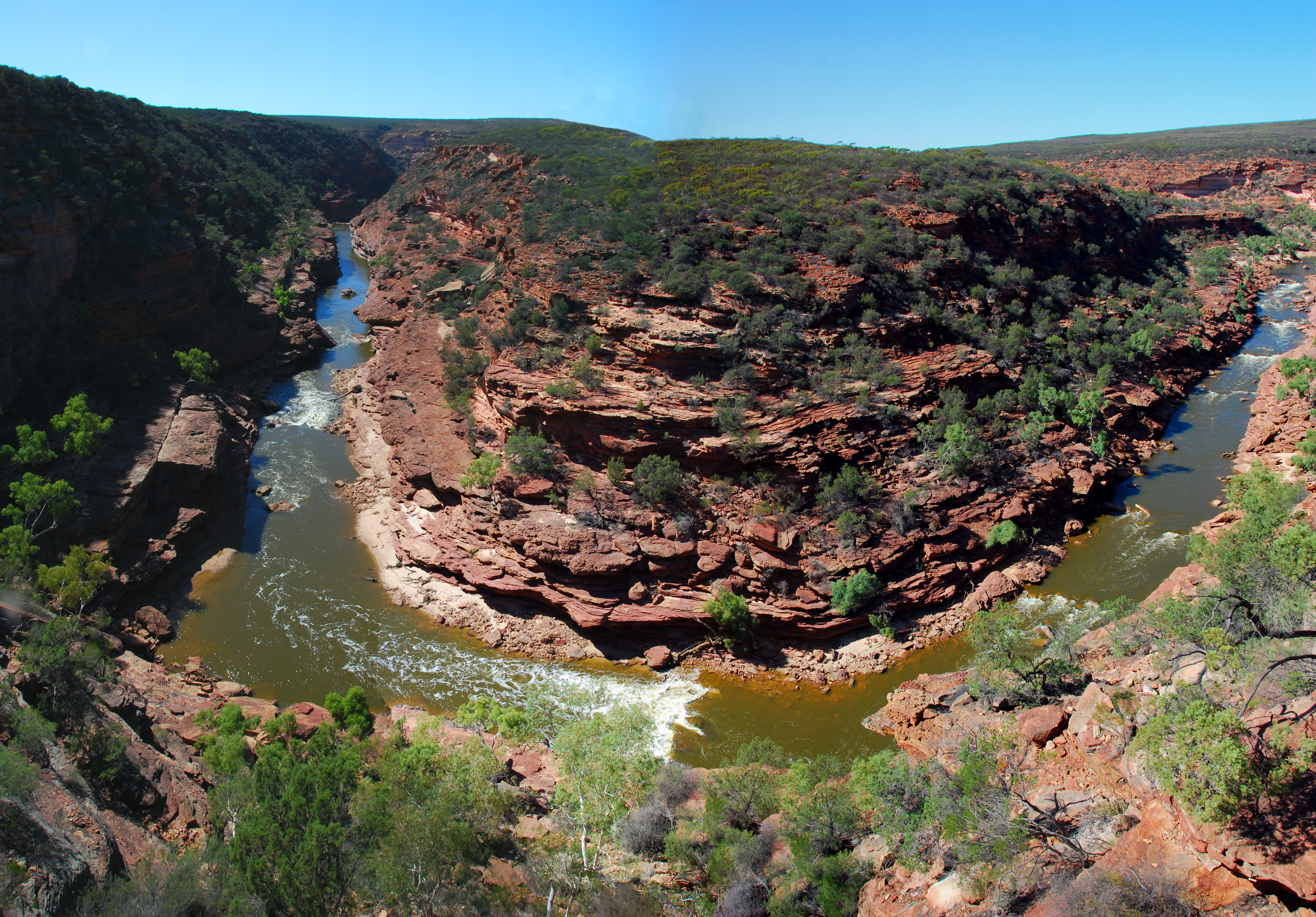
Z Bend, a sharp meander of the river
Flora
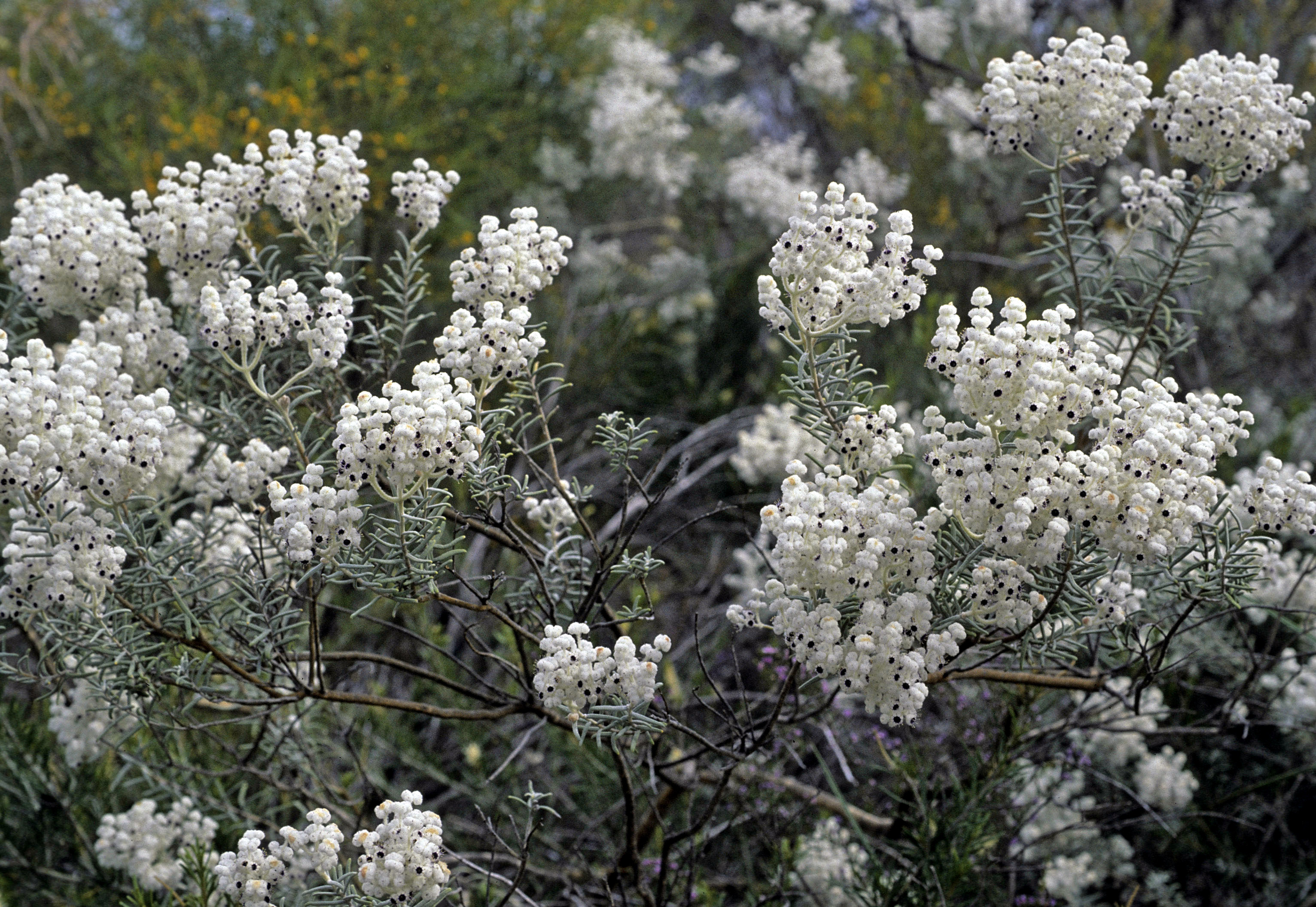
Lachnostachys eriobotrya

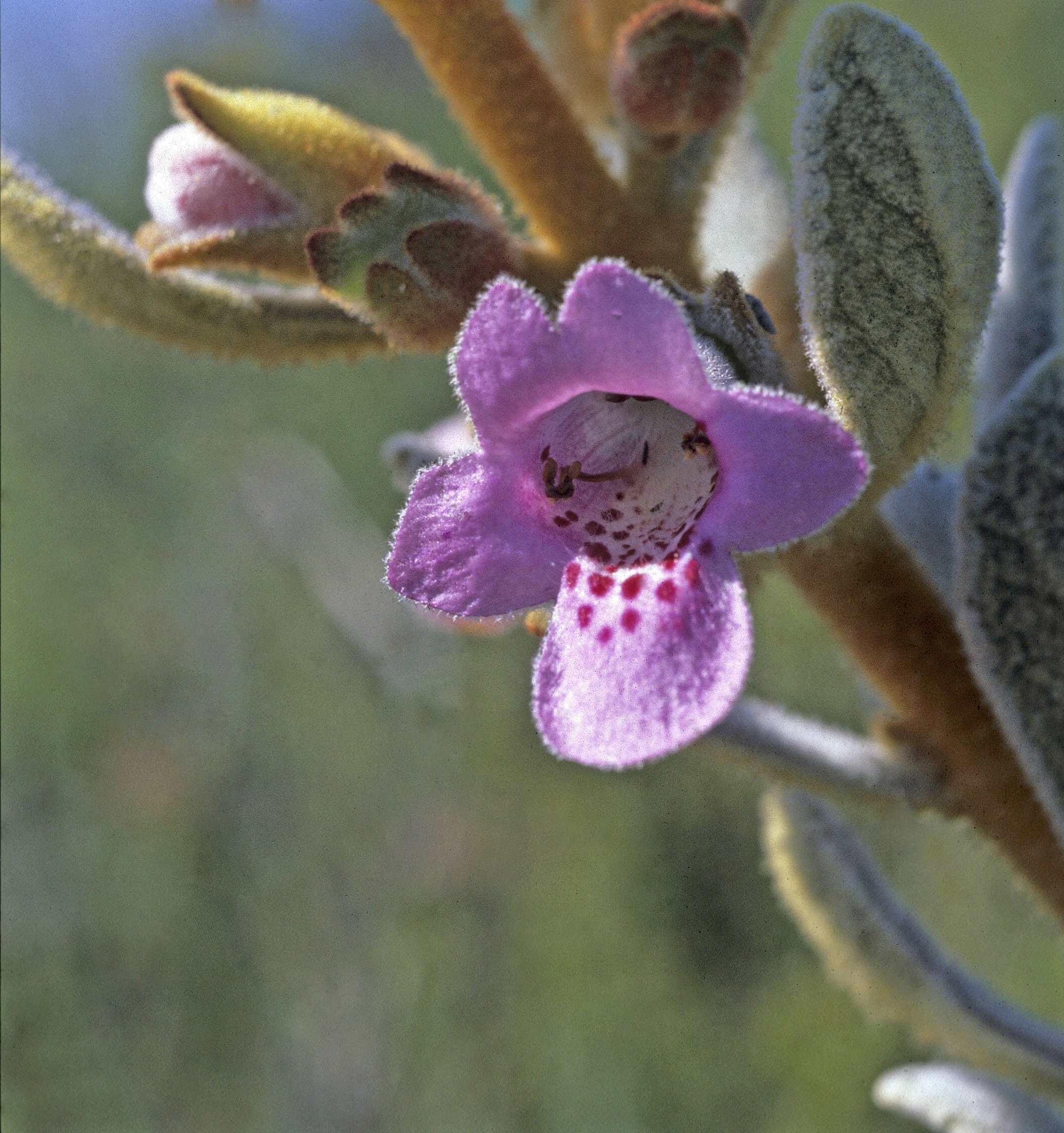
Quoya oldfieldii

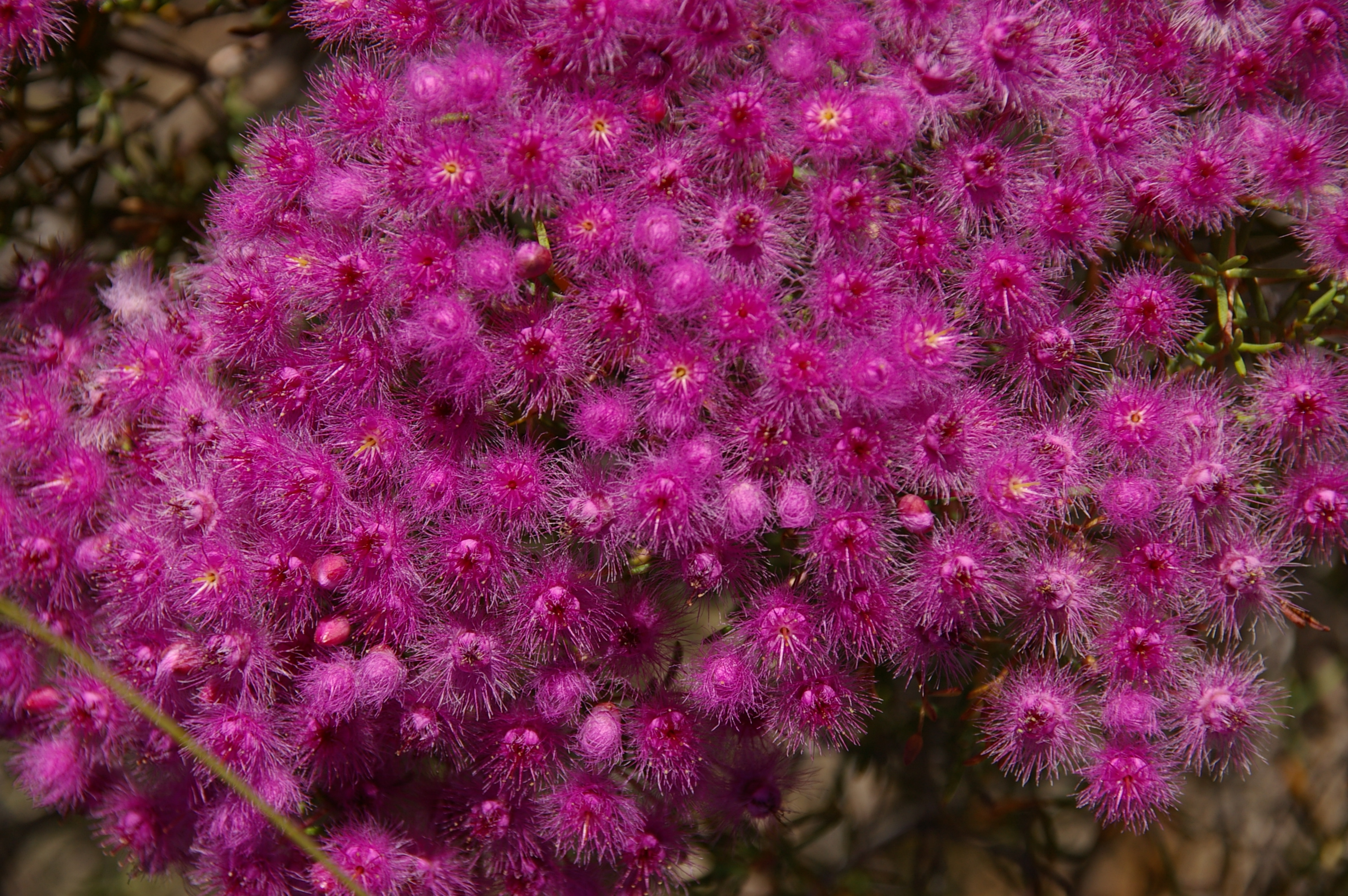
Verticordia monadelpha

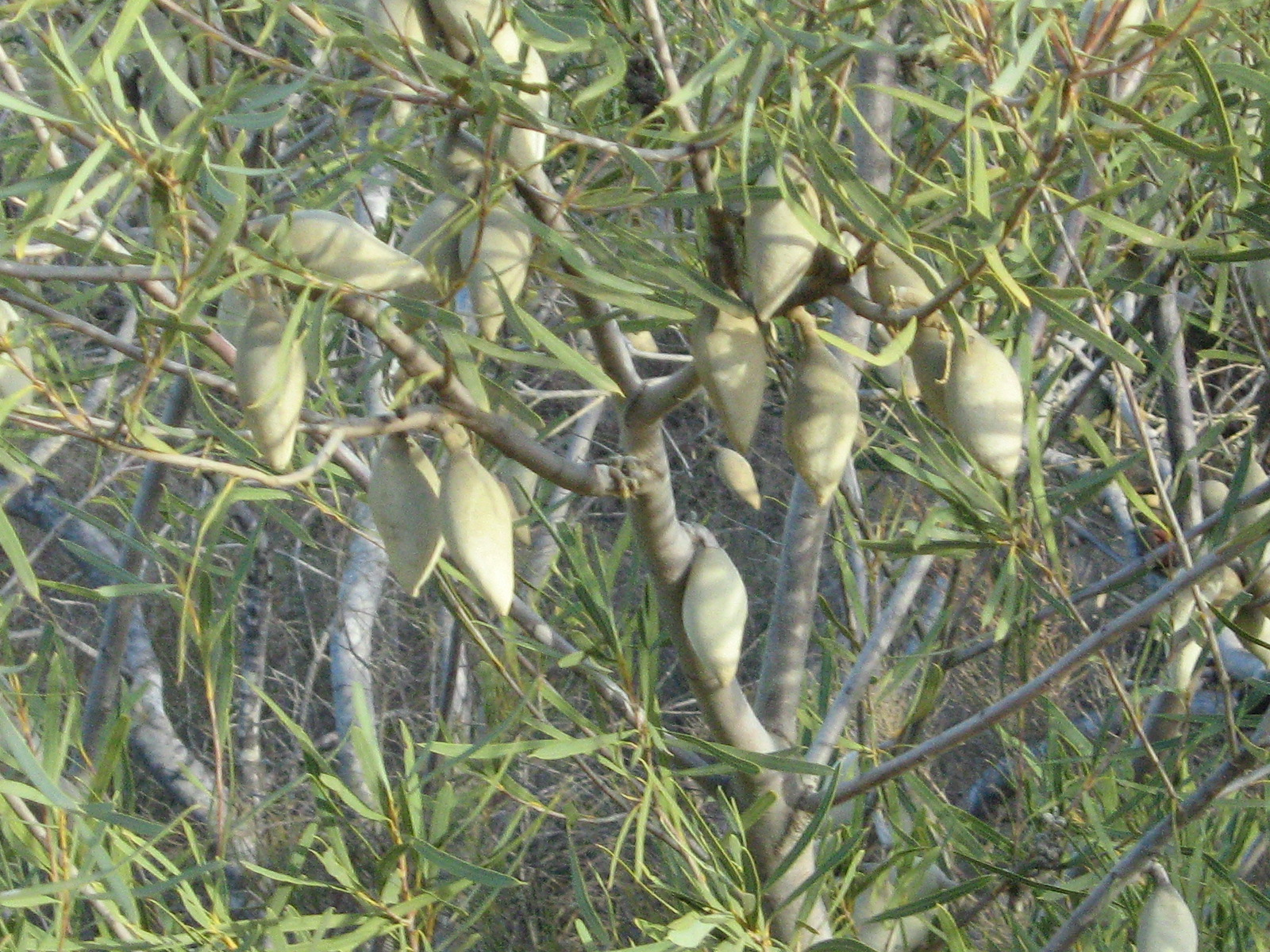
Xylomelum angustifolium

== See also ==
- Protected areas of Western Australia
