= Kalbarri, Western Australia =

Kalbarri
- Town
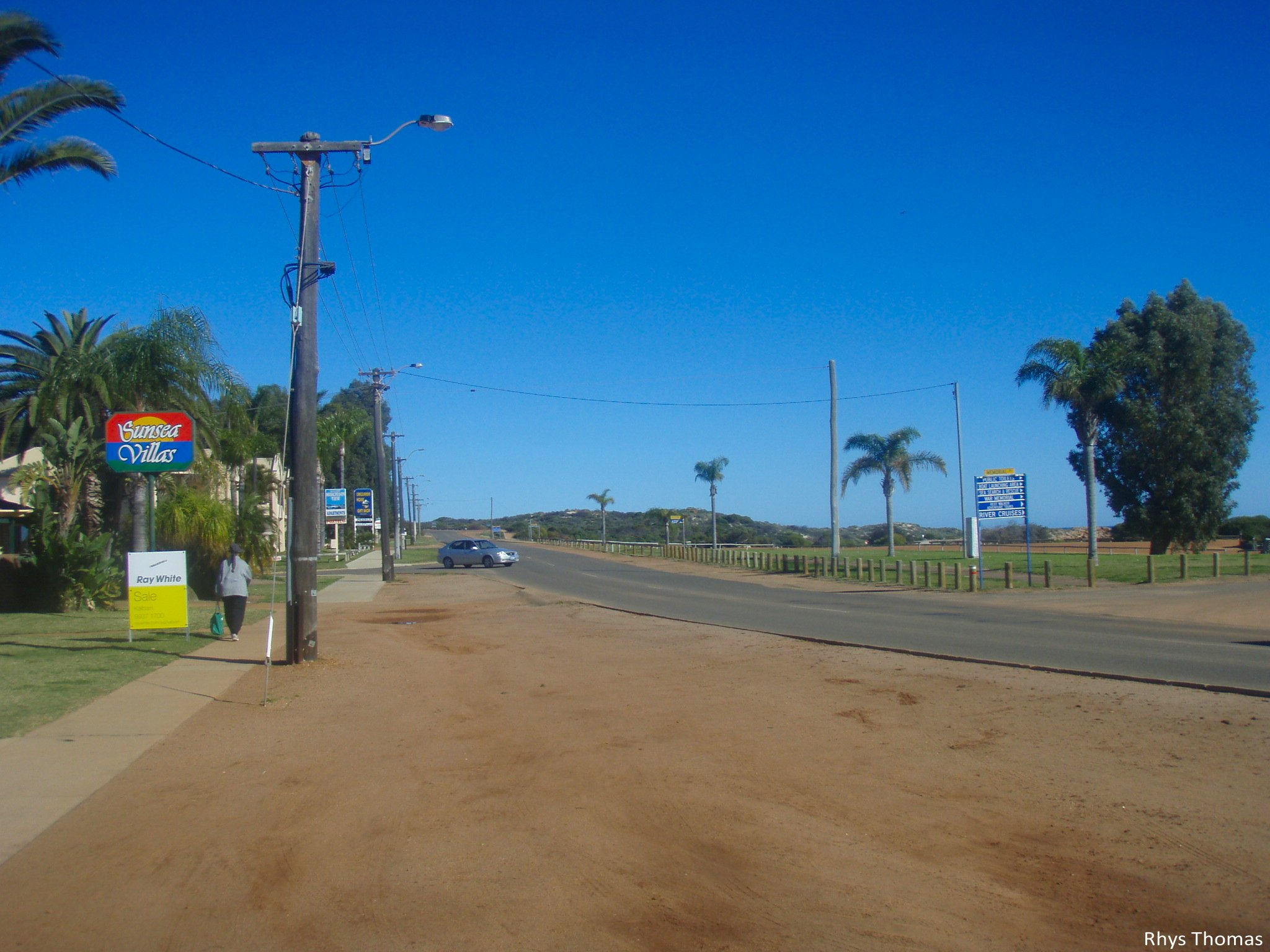
- Kalbarri town, c. 2009

- Interactive map of Kalbarri
- Coordinates: 27.71°S 114.16°E
- Country: Australia
- State: Western Australia
- LGA: Shire of Northampton
- Location: 592 km (368 mi) north of Perth; 167 km (104 mi) north of Geraldton
- Established: 1951

Government
  - State electorate: North West Central
  - Federal division: Durack

Area
  - Total: 142.3 km^{2} (54.9 sq mi)
- Elevation: 6 m (20 ft)

Population
  - Total: 1,270 (UCL 2021)
- Postcode: 6536
- Mean max temp: 27.8 °C (82.0 °F)
- Mean min temp: 14.7 °C (58.5 °F)
- Annual rainfall: 342.2 mm (13.47 in)

Kalbarri is a coastal town in the Mid West region located 592 km (368 mi) north of Perth, Western Australia. The town is located at the mouth of the Murchison River, which has an elevation of 6 metres (20 ft). It is connected by public transport to Perth via Transwa coach services N1 and N2.

== History ==
Kalbarri is a part of the traditional lands of the Nanda people, who were recognised as the traditional owners of more than 17,000 square kilometres (6,600 sq mi) of land and water in the Yamatji region, in Western Australia, on 28 November 2018. Nanda people have been awarded exclusive native title rights over several key areas including Paradise Flats, Bully, Wilgie Mia, Mooliabatanya and Syphon pools.

The story of the Beemarra serpent is the central Dreaming story of Nanda people. The Beemarra is, according to Nanda culture, an ancestral being responsible for the creation of the land and waters in the region.

The area became a popular fishing and tourist spot in the 1940s and, by 1948, the state government declared a town site. Lots were surveyed and the town was gazetted in 1951 with 50 lots of land released and purchased.

Kalbarri was named after an Aboriginal man from the Nanda tribe and is also the name of an edible seed. However, earlier in its history in was known colloquially as 'Mouth of the Murch' by visitors and residence and the name Kalbarri did not become commonly used until 1963 when the Kalbarri Post Office was opened.

The cliffs near the river mouth are named after Zuytdorp, a trading ship of the Dutch East India Company (Vereenigde Oost-Indische Compagnie, commonly abbreviated VOC, that was wrecked there in 1712.

In April 2021, the town suffered serious damage from Tropical Cyclone Seroja.

== Tourism ==
The town is geared towards tourism and fishing, and 200,000 tourists every year, with the population of the town swelling to 8,000 during holiday seasons. Attractions include daily pelican feeding, the Kalbarri National Park, Murchison River Gorge and the Murchison River. There are two charter boats to go on to view the Murchison River. Electricity to the town and hotels is supplied by a fragile 33 kV power line from the central grid. To increase grid stability, a 5 MW, 2 MWh (7.2 GJ) grid battery has been installed.

The Kalbarri National Park is home to a phenomenon of geography and geology known as the Z Bend, a tourist lookout, and "Nature's Window", a rock formation overlooking the Murchison River.

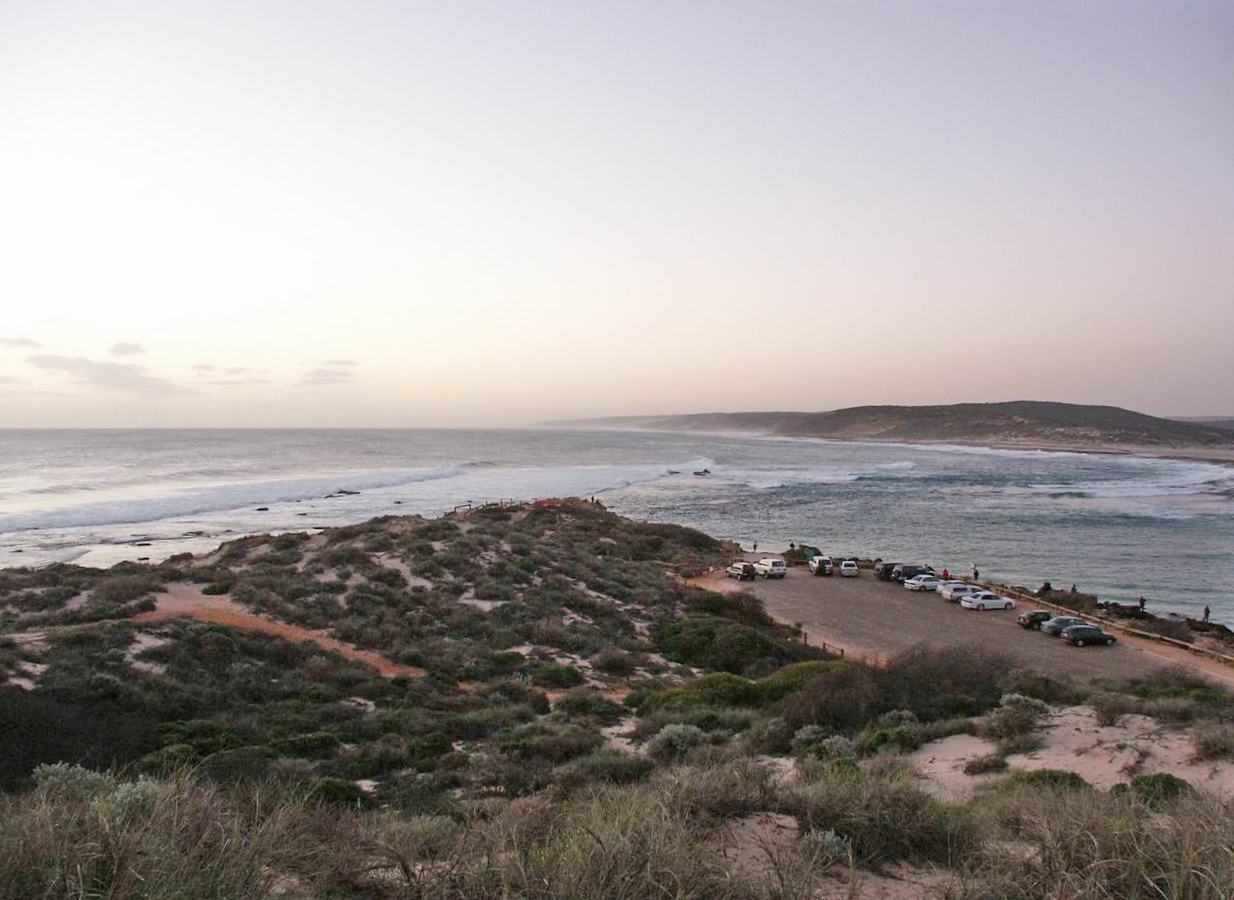
Murchison River mouth at sunset, 2003

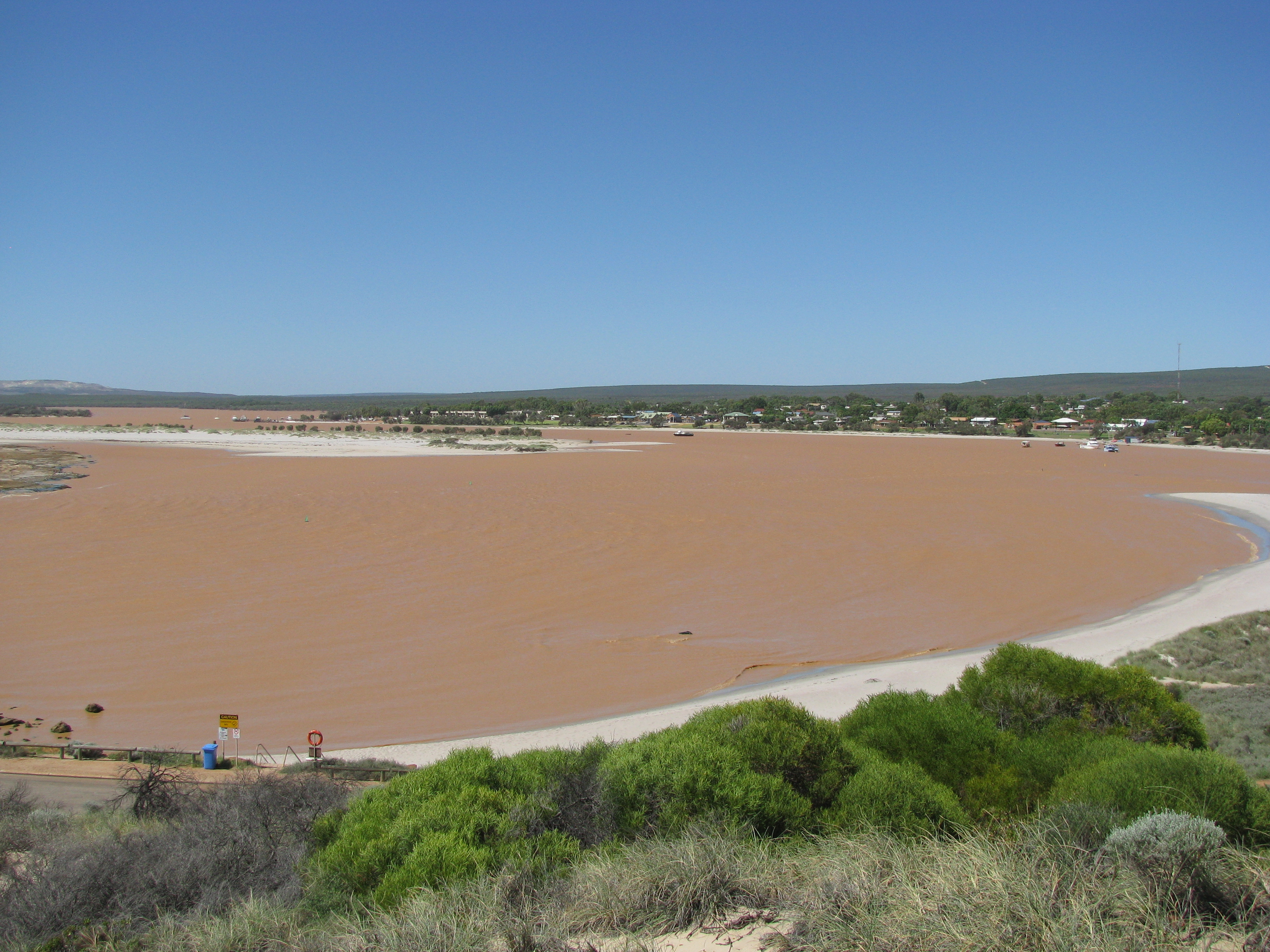
Murchison River after heavy rain, 2011

== Climate ==
Kalbarri experiences a hot semi-arid climate (Köppen: BSh) with hot, dry summers and warm, somewhat rainy winters. Average maxima vary from 34.1 °C (93.4 °F) in February to 21.9 °C (71.4 °F) in July, while average minima fluctuate between 20.7 °C (69.3 °F) in February and 9.7 °C (49.5 °F) in July. Annual rainfall is rather low, averaging 342.2 mm (13.47 in), and is spread across 43.2 days with at least 1 mm (0.04 in).

The town is very sunny, experiencing 185.9 clear days and only 59.9 cloudy days annually. Temperature extremes have ranged from 48.3 °C (118.9 °F) on 20 January 2025 to −1.3 °C (29.7 °F) on 24 July 1979. On 11 April 2021, the town was struck by Category 3 Cyclone Seroja, which caused significant damage and widespread power outages.

Climate data for Kalbarri (27.71°S 114.17°E, 6 m AMSL) (1970-2024 data)
Month	Jan	Feb	Mar	Apr	May	Jun	Jul	Aug	Sep	Oct	Nov	Dec	Year
Record high °C (°F)	48.3 (118.9)	48.1 (118.6)	47.2 (117.0)	39.7 (103.5)	36.2 (97.2)	30.9 (87.6)	30.5 (86.9)	33.0 (91.4)	38.5 (101.3)	41.2 (106.2)	42.4 (108.3)	46.5 (115.7)	48.3 (118.9)
Mean daily maximum °C (°F)	33.2 (91.8)	34.1 (93.4)	32.6 (90.7)	29.6 (85.3)	26.2 (79.2)	23.0 (73.4)	21.9 (71.4)	22.6 (72.7)	24.1 (75.4)	26.2 (79.2)	28.4 (83.1)	31.2 (88.2)	27.8 (82.0)
Mean daily minimum °C (°F)	19.7 (67.5)	20.7 (69.3)	19.4 (66.9)	16.4 (61.5)	13.4 (56.1)	11.1 (52.0)	9.7 (49.5)	10.0 (50.0)	10.9 (51.6)	12.7 (54.9)	15.1 (59.2)	17.7 (63.9)	14.7 (58.5)
Record low °C (°F)	10.2 (50.4)	11.1 (52.0)	10.0 (50.0)	3.6 (38.5)	3.7 (38.7)	1.1 (34.0)	−1.3 (29.7)	−0.4 (31.3)	1.9 (35.4)	4.1 (39.4)	6.7 (44.1)	8.1 (46.6)	−1.3 (29.7)
Average rainfall mm (inches)	4.9 (0.19)	8.3 (0.33)	11.6 (0.46)	18.9 (0.74)	52.2 (2.06)	80.1 (3.15)	71.0 (2.80)	48.3 (1.90)	23.3 (0.92)	13.8 (0.54)	6.8 (0.27)	3.6 (0.14)	342.2 (13.47)
Average rainy days (≥ 1.0 mm)	0.9	1.0	1.2	2.3	5.1	8.2	8.5	6.9	4.5	2.6	1.5	0.5	43.2
Average afternoon relative humidity (%)	47	46	48	50	51	54	55	53	53	49	50	48	50
Average dew point °C (°F)	16.6 (61.9)	17.4 (63.3)	16.6 (61.9)	15.1 (59.2)	12.5 (54.5)	10.9 (51.6)	10.5 (50.9)	10.2 (50.4)	11.3 (52.3)	11.8 (53.2)	13.7 (56.7)	15.3 (59.5)	13.5 (56.3)
Source: Bureau of Meteorology (1970-2024 data)

== In popular culture ==
- Kalbarri was featured at the end of the 2005 film Wolf Creek when character Ben Mitchell (Nathan Phillips) was airlifted to hospital from Kalbarri Airport.
- In the television series Prison Break, character James Whistler states he is originally from Kalbarri.
