= Acacia baxteri =

Baxter's wattle

Scientific classification
- Kingdom: Plantae
- Clade: Tracheophytes
- Clade: Angiosperms
- Clade: Eudicots
- Clade: Rosids
- Order: Fabales
- Family: Fabaceae
- Subfamily: Caesalpinioideae
- Clade: Mimosoid clade
- Genus: Acacia
- Species: A. baxteri

Binomial name
- Acacia baxteri Benth.
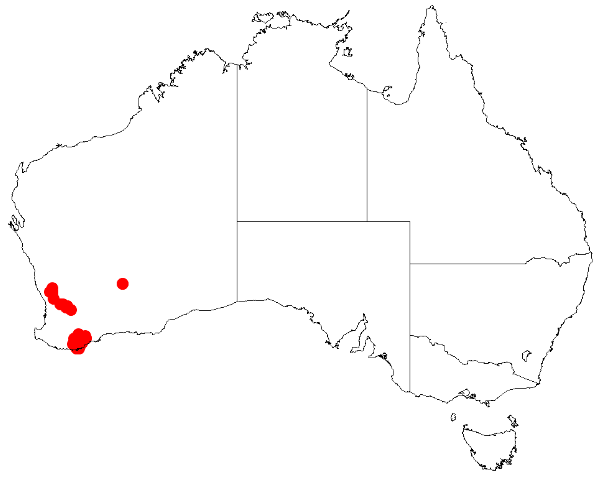
- Acacia baxteri occurrence data from Australasian Virtual Herbarium

Synonyms
- Acacia bagsteri Benth. orth. var.; Racosperma baxteri (Benth.) Pedley

Species of shrub

Habit on the road to Bluff Knoll

Acacia baxteri, commonly known as Baxter's wattle, is a species of flowering plant in the family Fabaceae and is endemic to the south-west of Western Australia. It is a compact shrub with linear to narrowly oblong, sharply-pointed phyllodes, spherical heads of golden-yellow flowers, and curved, dark reddish brown pods up to 65 mm (2.6 in) long.

== Description ==
Acacia baxteri is a compact shrub that typically grows to a height of 30–60 cm (12–24 in). Its branchlets are ribbed, glabrous and sometimes have a powdery white coating. The phyllodes are sessile, variable, often narrowly linear or narrowly oblong and five-sided in cross-section, 10–26 mm (0.39–1.02 in) long and usually 1–4 mm (0.039–0.157 in) wide. There are more or less spiny stipules 1–3 mm (0.039–0.118 in) long at the base of the phyllodes. The flowers are borne in single spherical heads in axils on a peduncle usually 3–10 mm (0.12–0.39 in) long, each head with about 30 to 50 golden-yellow flowers. Flowering occurs in February and May or from September to December, and the pods are curved, more or less circular in cross section, dark reddish brown, up to 65 mm (2.6 in) long and 3.5–5 mm (0.14–0.20 in) wide. The seeds are oblong, greyish brown and 5–6 mm (0.20–0.24 in) long with a small, cone-shaped aril.

== Taxonomy ==
Acacia baxteri was first formally described in 1842 by the botanist George Bentham, who erroneously gave it the name A. bagsteri in The London Journal of Botany, from specimens collected by William Baxter at King George Sound. The specific epithet honours the collector of the type specimens.

This species is closely related to A. andrewsii, and has phyllodes that are similar to A. unifissilis.

== Distribution and habitat ==
Baxter's wattle has a disjunct distribution in the south-west of Western Australia. The main population is found between Ongerup and Albany with isolated populations further north between Walebing and Quairading. The species is found in the Avon Wheatbelt, Esperance Plains, Jarrah Forest and Swan Coastal Plain bioregions.

== See also ==
- List of Acacia species
