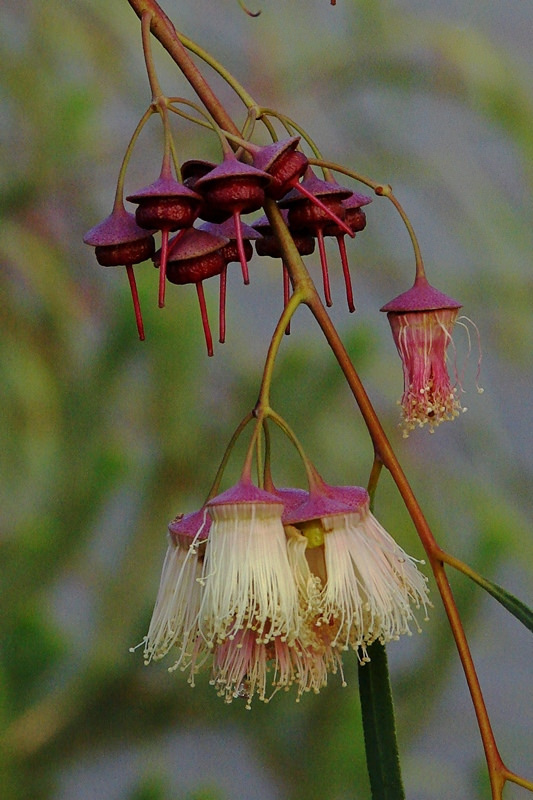
- Eucalyptus synandra capsules and blossom

Conservation status
- Endangered (IUCN 3.1)

- Declared rare (DEC)

Scientific classification
- Kingdom: Plantae
- Clade: Tracheophytes
- Clade: Angiosperms
- Clade: Eudicots
- Clade: Rosids
- Order: Myrtales
- Family: Myrtaceae
- Genus: Eucalyptus
- Species: E. synandra

Binomial name
- Eucalyptus synandra Crisp

= Eucalyptus synandra =

Jingymia mallee

Species of eucalyptus

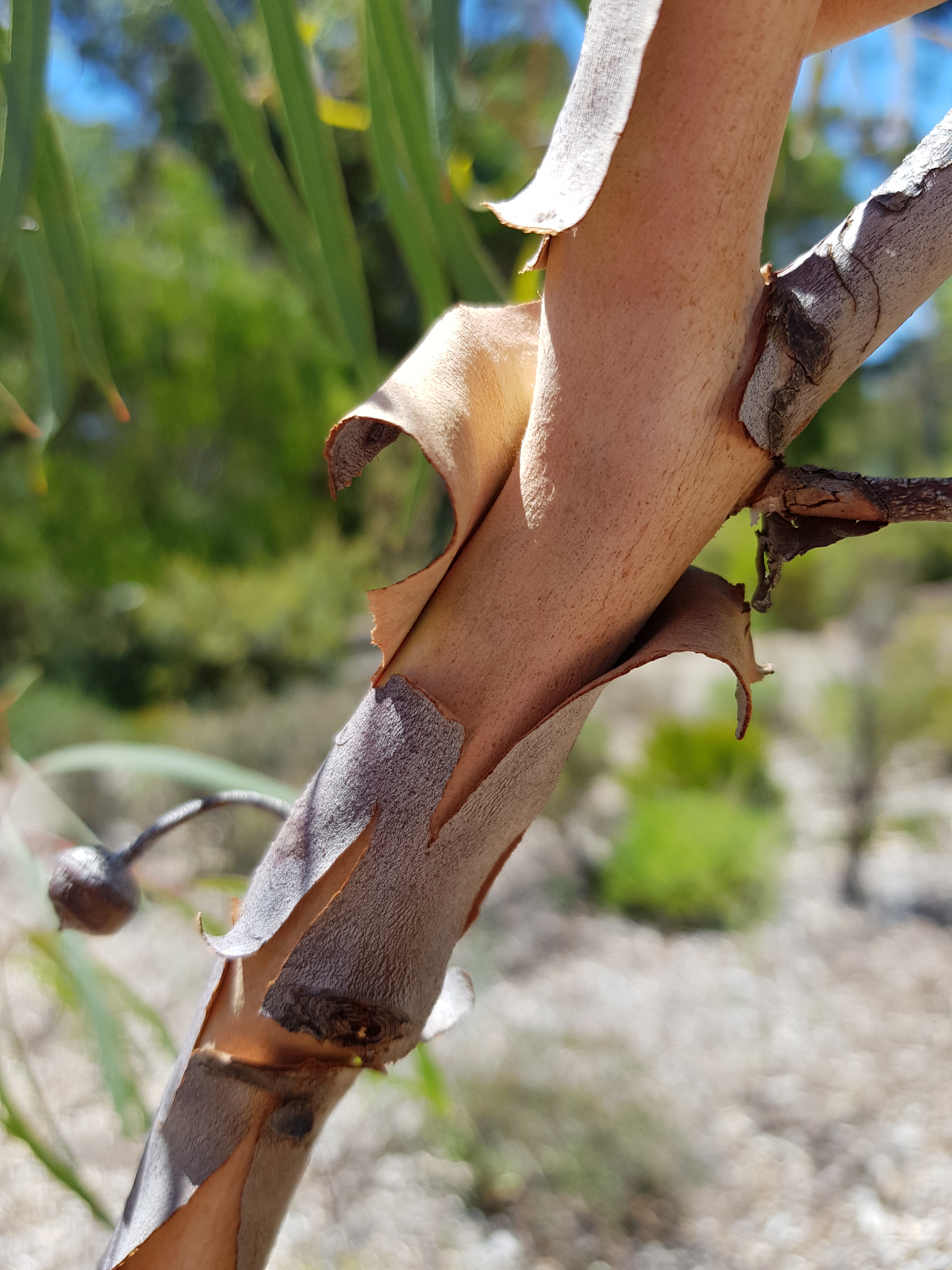
Bark of Eucalyptus synandra

Eucalyptus synandra, commonly known as Jingymia mallee, is a mallee that is native to Western Australia. It has smooth bark, dull green, linear to narrow lance-shaped leaves, flower buds in groups of seven, creamy white to pink flowers and hemispherical to saucer-shaped fruit.

== Description ==
Eucalyptus synandra is a mallee that typically grows to a height of 3.5 to 10 metres (11 to 33 ft) with a width of 3 to 7 metres (10 to 23 ft) and forms a lignotuber. The bark is smooth, white to grey, sometimes powdery, and is shed in ribbons to reveal pink and brownish new bark. It has an open canopy that allows some light through. Young plants and coppice regrowth have dull greyish green leaves that are 55–90 mm (2.2–3.5 in) long and 5–15 mm (0.20–0.59 in) wide. Adult leaves are the same shade of dull green on both sides, linear to narrow lance-shaped, 100–170 mm (3.9–6.7 in) long and 5–10 mm (0.20–0.39 in) wide, the base tapering to a petiole 3–17 mm (0.12–0.67 in) long. The flower buds are arranged in leaf axils in groups of seven on a thin, unbranched peduncle 10–25 mm (0.39–0.98 in) long, the individual buds on pedicels 10–15 mm (0.39–0.59 in) long. Mature buds are oval, 11–21 mm (0.43–0.83 in) long and 6–8 mm (0.24–0.31 in) wide with a hemispherical floral cup and a conical operculum that has a long, thin beak. Flowering occurs between August and March and the flowers are creamy white to pink. The lower half of the stamens merge into a single tube. The fruit is a conical to hemispherical, suacer-like capsule 4–6 mm (0.16–0.24 in) long and 9–13 mm (0.35–0.51 in) wide with an ascending disc and between five and seven valves at rim level or protruding above it.

== Taxonomy ==
Eucalyptus synandra was first formally described by the botanist Michael Douglas Crisp in 1982 in the journal Nuytsia. The type specimen was collected in 1981 by Alex George about 5 kilometres (3.1 mi) south of Jingymia in the Shire of Koorda. The specific epithet (synandra) is from ancient Greek words meaning "together" and "male", referring to the joined stamens.

== Distribution ==
Jingymia mallee is found as several small populations on sandplains and rises in an area between Geraldton and Mount Marshall in the Mid West, Wheatbelt regions where it grows in sandy and gravelly lateritic soils. The 27 separate populations of the species, containing about 1200 individual plants are scattered over a 300 kilometres (186 mi) length mostly between north of Morawa to around Koorda. They are mostly found on road verges but also on private land, conservation areas, pastoral leases and a timber reserve. It is usually found heath and scrub communities, associated with species including Eucalyptus leptopoda, E. erwartiana, E. loxophleba subsp. supralaevis, E. subangusta, E. brachycorys, Acacia coolgardiensis, A. acuaria and Hakea recurva.

== Conservation status ==
This mallee is classified as "Threatened Flora (Declared Rare Flora — Extant)" by the Department of Environment and Conservation (Western Australia). The IUCN Red List assesses the species as endangered.

== Use in horticulture ==
Although the tree is not commonly cultivated, it is commercially available in seed form or as seedlings. The drought tolerant plant grows in full sun and attracts birds such as honeyeaters to the garden.

== See also ==
- List of Eucalyptus species
