= Acacia lobulata =

Chiddarcooping wattle

Conservation status
- Endangered (EPBC Act)

Scientific classification
- Kingdom: Plantae
- Clade: Tracheophytes
- Clade: Angiosperms
- Clade: Eudicots
- Clade: Rosids
- Order: Fabales
- Family: Fabaceae
- Subfamily: Caesalpinioideae
- Clade: Mimosoid clade
- Genus: Acacia
- Species: A. lobulata

Binomial name
- Acacia lobulata R.S.Cowan & Maslin
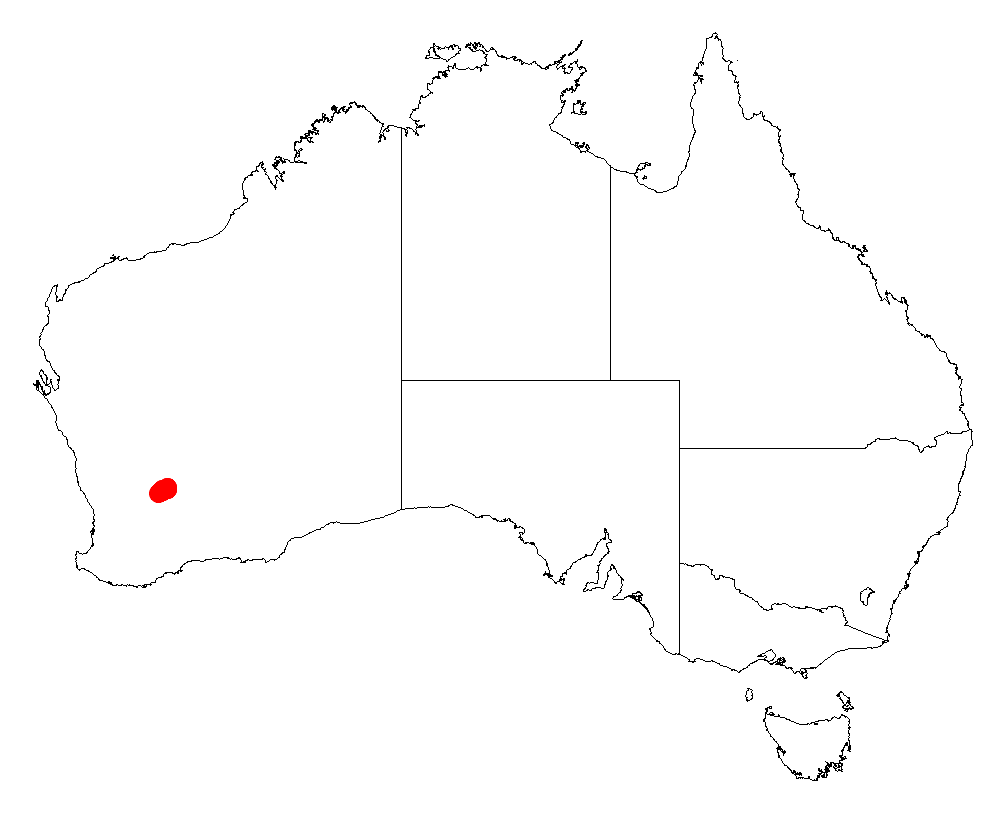
- Occurrence data from AVH

Synonyms
- Acacia sp. (Chiddarcooping) J.Brown 59 & A.Williams; Racosperma lobulatum (R.S.Cowan & Maslin) Pedley

Species of legume

Acacia lobulata, commonly known as Chiddarcooping wattle, is a species of flowering plant in the family Fabaceae and is endemic to the a small area of the south-west of Western Australia. It is an erect, open, often spindly shrub, with glabrous, resinous branchlets, ascending curved, terete phyllodes, usually spherical heads of yellow flowers, and linear, strongly curved, thinly papery pods raised over the seeds. It was declared as rare flora in 1997 and is now listed as endangered under the Environment Protection and Biodiversity Conservation Act 1999.

== Description ==
Acacia lobulata is an erect, open, often spindly shrub that typically grows to a height of 1–2 m (3 ft 3 in – 6 ft 7 in) and has slightly angled, glabrous, resinous and more or less wary branchlets. Its phyllodes are ascending, curved, terete, 15–35 mm (0.59–1.38 in) long and 0.7–0.8 mm (0.028–0.031 in) wide with resinous, impressed veins forming an coarse, regular network with a gland up to 2 mm (0.079 in) above the pulvinus. The flowers are usually borne singly in spherical heads, occasionally in pairs, in axils on a peduncle 2.5–4.5 mm (0.098–0.177 in) long, the heads 3.5–4.5 mm (0.14–0.18 in) in diameter with 15 to 17 yellow flowers. Flowers have been collected in July, and the pods are linear and strongly curved, up to 60 mm (2.4 in) long, 3–4 mm (0.12–0.16 in) wide, thinly papery, smooth, glabrous, resinous and strongly raised over the seeds. The seeds are oblong, compressed, 4–5.5 mm (0.16–0.22 in) long and dull dark brown.

== Taxonomy ==
Acacia lobulata was first formally described in 1990 by Richard Cowan and Bruce Maslin in the journal Nuytsia from specimens collected by Maslin in the Chiddarcooping Nature Reserve in 1989. The specific epithet (lobulata) "calls attention to the most striking feature of this species – the surface of the phyllodes".

== Distribution and habitat ==
Chiddarcooping wattle is native to a small area in the Avon Wheatbelt and Coolgardie bioregions of Western Australia where it grows in gritty loam and sandy soils at the foot of decomposing granite breakaways in woodland and shrubland. The range of the plant is only about 17 km (11 mi) containing three populations adjacent to the Chiddarcooping Nature Reserve in the Westonia and Nungarin Shires, with Acacia andrewsii, Daviesia nematophylla, Eucalyptus yilgarnensis, Melaleuca uncinata and Austrodanthania setacea species.

== Conservation status ==
Acacia lobulata is listed as 'Endangered' under the Australian Government Environment Protection and Biodiversity Conservation Act 1999 and as 'Threatened' by the Government of Western Australia Department of Biodiversity, Conservation and Attractions. The main threats to the species include road maintenance, insecure land tenure and weed invasion.

== See also ==
- List of Acacia species
