= Petrophile incurvata =

Scientific classification
- Kingdom: Plantae
- Clade: Tracheophytes
- Clade: Angiosperms
- Clade: Eudicots
- Order: Proteales
- Family: Proteaceae
- Genus: Petrophile
- Species: P. incurvata

Binomial name
- Petrophile incurvata W.Fitzg.

Synonyms
- Petrophila incurvata W.Fitzg. orth. var.; Petrophile conifera var. incurvata (F.Muell. ex Benth.) C.A.Gardner MS; Petrophile semifurcata var. planifolia F.Muell.

Species of shrub endemic to Western Australia

Petrophile incurvata is a species of flowering plant in the family Proteaceae and is endemic to southwestern Western Australia. It is a shrub with flattened, sometimes pinnately-divided leaves with up to five sharply pointed lobes, and cylindrical to oval heads of silky-hairy, cream-coloured to yellowish-white flowers.

== Description ==
Petrophile incurvata is a much-branched shrub that typically grows to a height of 0.7–1.2 m (2 ft 4 in – 3 ft 11 in) high and has hairy young branchlets that become glabrous as they age. The leaves are flattened, curved upwards, about 70–120 mm (2.8–4.7 in) long and sharply pointed, or pinnately-divided with up to five sharply-pointed lobes. The flowers are arranged on the ends of branchlets in cylindrical to oval heads, sometimes two or three together, up to about 35 mm (1.4 in) long and sessile or on a peduncle about 10 mm (0.39 in) long, with linear involucral bracts at the base. The flowers are 10–14 mm (0.39–0.55 in) long, cream-coloured to yellowish-white and silky-hairy. Flowering mainly occurs in October and the fruit is a nut, fused with others in an oval to cylindrical head 20–30 mm (0.79–1.18 in) long.

== Taxonomy ==
Petrophile incurvata was first formally described in 1912 by William Vincent Fitzgerald in the Journal of Botany, British and Foreign from material collected by Max Koch near Watheroo. The specific epithet (incurvata) refers to the upwardly-curved leaves.

== Distribution and habitat ==
This petrophile grows in shrubland from Lake Moore near Paynes Find to Wubin in the Avon Wheatbelt, Coolgardie, Geraldton Sandplains and Yalgoo biogeographic regions of southwestern Western Australia.

== Conservation status ==
Petrophile incurvata is classified as "not threatened" by the Western Australian Government Department of Parks and Wildlife.
