= Acacia acutata =

Scientific classification
- Kingdom: Plantae
- Clade: Tracheophytes
- Clade: Angiosperms
- Clade: Eudicots
- Clade: Rosids
- Order: Fabales
- Family: Fabaceae
- Subfamily: Caesalpinioideae
- Clade: Mimosoid clade
- Genus: Acacia
- Species: A. acutata

Binomial name
- Acacia acutata W.Fitzg.
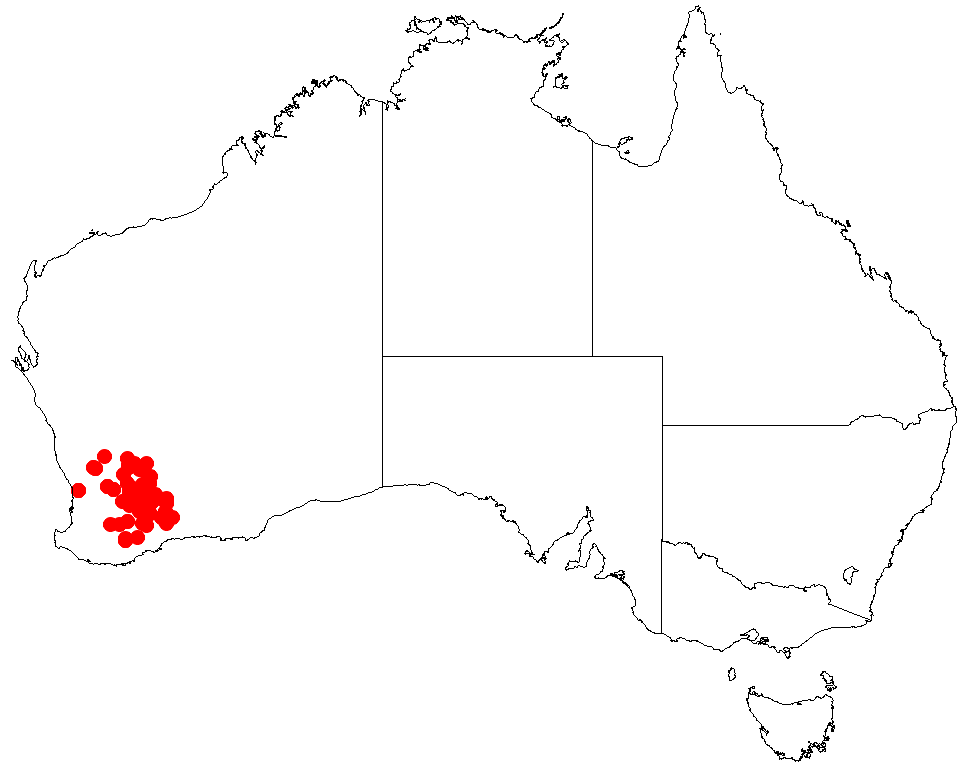
- Occurrence data from AVH

Synonyms
- Racosperma acutatum (W.Fitzg.) Pedley; Acacia costata auct. non Benth.: Bentham, G., Flora Australiensis

Species of legume

Acacia acutata is a species of flowering plant in the family Fabaceae and is endemic to the south-west of Western Australia. It is an inticately branched, often compact shrub with spiny branchlets, sharply pointed, triangular to trowel-shaped phyllodes, flowers arranged in spherical heads of 11 to 15 flowers, and firmly papery pods, rounded over the seeds.

== Description ==
Acacia acutata is an intricately branched, glabrous, often compact shrub that typically grows to a height of 30–60 cm (12–24 in) and has rigid, spiny branchlets. The phyllodes are triangular to trowel-shaped, 4–12 mm (0.16–0.47 in) long and 0.8–2.0 mm (0.031–0.079 in) wide and sharply pointed, with a prominent midvein. There are stipules at the base of the phyllodes, but that fall off as the phyllodes mature. The flowers are borne in spherical heads on a peduncle 2–4 mm (0.079–0.157 in) long, each head with 11 to 15 golden flowers with thin bracteoles at the base, but fall off as the flowers develop. Flowering occurs from August to October and the pod is firmly papery, up to 22 mm (0.87 in) long and 2.5–3.5 mm (0.098–0.138 in) wide and prominently rounded over the seeds. The seeds are oblong to elliptic, about 2.5 mm (0.098 in)long.

== Taxonomy ==
Acacia acutata was first formally described in 1904 by William Vincent Fitzgerald in the Journal of the West Australian Natural History Society from specimens he collected near Cunderdin in 1903. The specific epithet (acutata) means "forming a sharp angle", referring to the phyllodes.

== Distribution ==
This species of wattle mainly occurs between Wongan Hills, Ongerup and Lake King where it is found among granite outcrops and sandplains growing in gravelly sandy, loamy or clay soils. It grows in woodland, mallee, or heathland in the Avon Wheatbelt, Coolgardie and Mallee bioregions of south-western Western Australia.

== See also ==
- List of Acacia species
