= Acacia xerophila =

Scientific classification
- Kingdom: Plantae
- Clade: Embryophytes
- Clade: Tracheophytes
- Clade: Angiosperms
- Clade: Eudicots
- Clade: Rosids
- Order: Fabales
- Family: Fabaceae
- Subfamily: Caesalpinioideae
- Clade: Mimosoid clade
- Genus: Acacia
- Species: A. xerophila

Binomial name
- Acacia xerophila W.Fitzg.
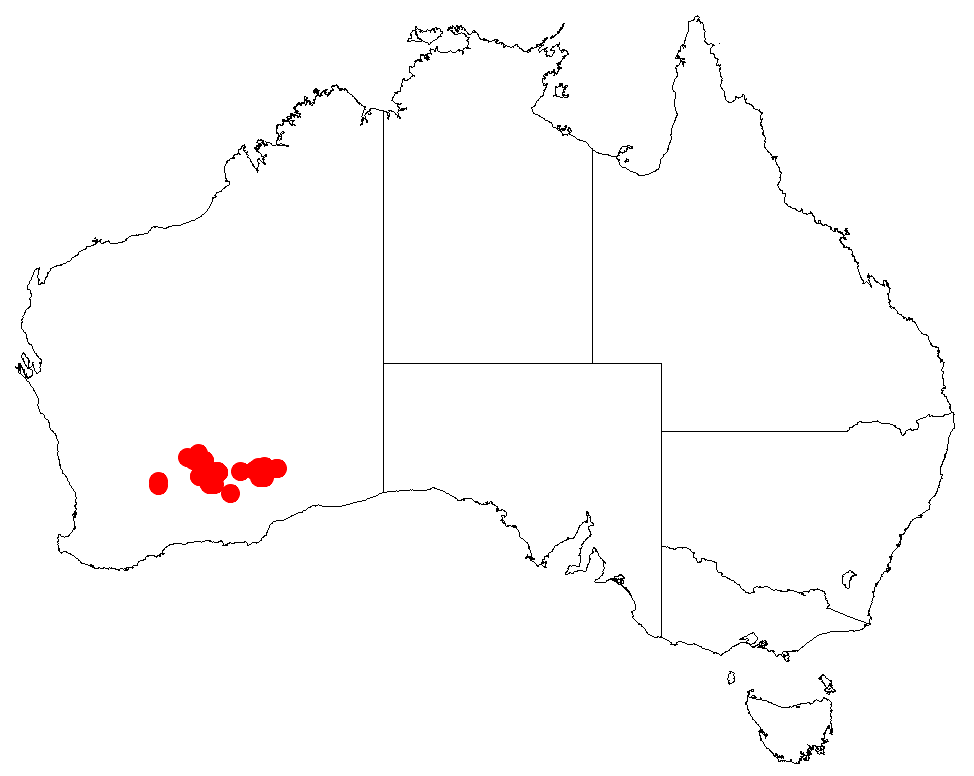
- Occurrence data from AVH

Species of legume

Acacia xerophila is a shrub of the genus Acacia and the subgenus Phyllodineae. It is native to an area in the Goldfields-Esperance region of Western Australia.

== Description ==
The shrub typically grows to a height of 0.15 to 1.0 metre (0.5 to 3.3 ft) and produces yellow flowers.

== Range ==
The species is endemic the desert and dry scrublands in southern parts of central Western Australia.

== Taxonommy ==
The plant was first described by the botanist William Vincent Fitzgerald in 1904.

== Varieties ==
There are two recognised varieties:

- Acacia xerophila var. brevior
- Acacia xerophila var. xerophila

== See also ==
- List of Acacia species
