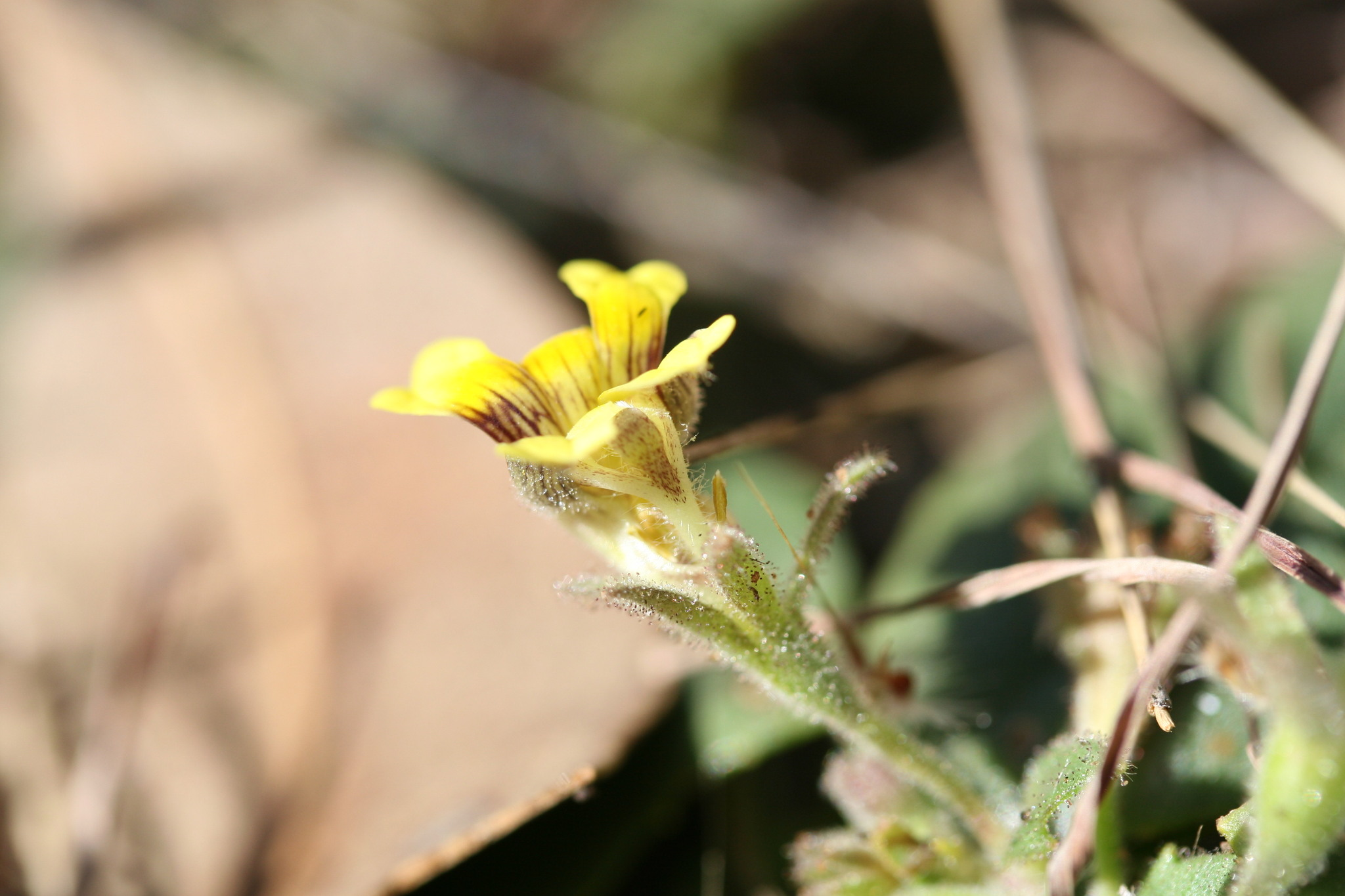

Scientific classification
- Kingdom: Plantae
- Clade: Tracheophytes
- Clade: Angiosperms
- Clade: Eudicots
- Clade: Asterids
- Order: Asterales
- Family: Goodeniaceae
- Genus: Goodenia
- Species: G. heppleana

Binomial name
- Goodenia heppleana (E.Pritz.) Carolin

Synonyms
- Calogyne heppleana W.Fitzg.

= Goodenia heppleana =

Species of plant

Goodenia heppleana is a species of flowering plant in the family Goodeniaceae and is endemic to northern Australia. It is an erect or prostrate herb with lance-shaped leaves at the base of the plant and racemes of yellow flowers.

== Description ==
Goodenia heppleana is an erect, low-lying or prostrate herb with stems up to 50 cm (20 in) long and hairy. The leaves at the base of the plant are lance-shaped with the narrower end towards the base, about 80 mm (3.1 in) long and 10–15 mm (0.39–0.59 in) wide. The flowers are arranged in a racemes up to 400 mm (16 in) long with leaf-like bracts, each flower on a hairy pedicel 18–25 mm (0.71–0.98 in) long. The sepals are lance-shaped to narrow elliptic, about 3.5 mm (0.14 in) long, the corolla yellow, hairy on the back, 10–12 mm (0.39–0.47 in) long. The lower lobes of the corolla are 4–5 mm (0.16–0.20 in) long with wings 0.5–1 mm (0.020–0.039 in) wide. Flowering mainly occurs from February to June and the fruit is a more or less spherical nut about 4 mm (0.16 in) in diameter.

== Taxonomy and naming ==
This species was first formally described in 1918 by William Vincent Fitzgerald who gave it the name Calogyne heppleana. In 1990 Roger Charles Carolin changed the name to Goodenia heppleana in the journal Telopea. The specific epithet (heppleana) honours the surveyor William Hepple Brown, an officer of the Kimberley Survey Expedition, 1905.

== Distribution and habitat ==
This goodenia grows in open forest and woodland in the north-east Kimberley region of Western Australia and in Arnhem Land in the Northern Territory.

== Conservation status ==
Goodenia heppleana is classified as "not threatened" by the Government of Western Australia Department of Parks and Wildlife and as of "least concern" under the Northern Territory Government Territory Parks and Wildlife Conservation Act 1976.
