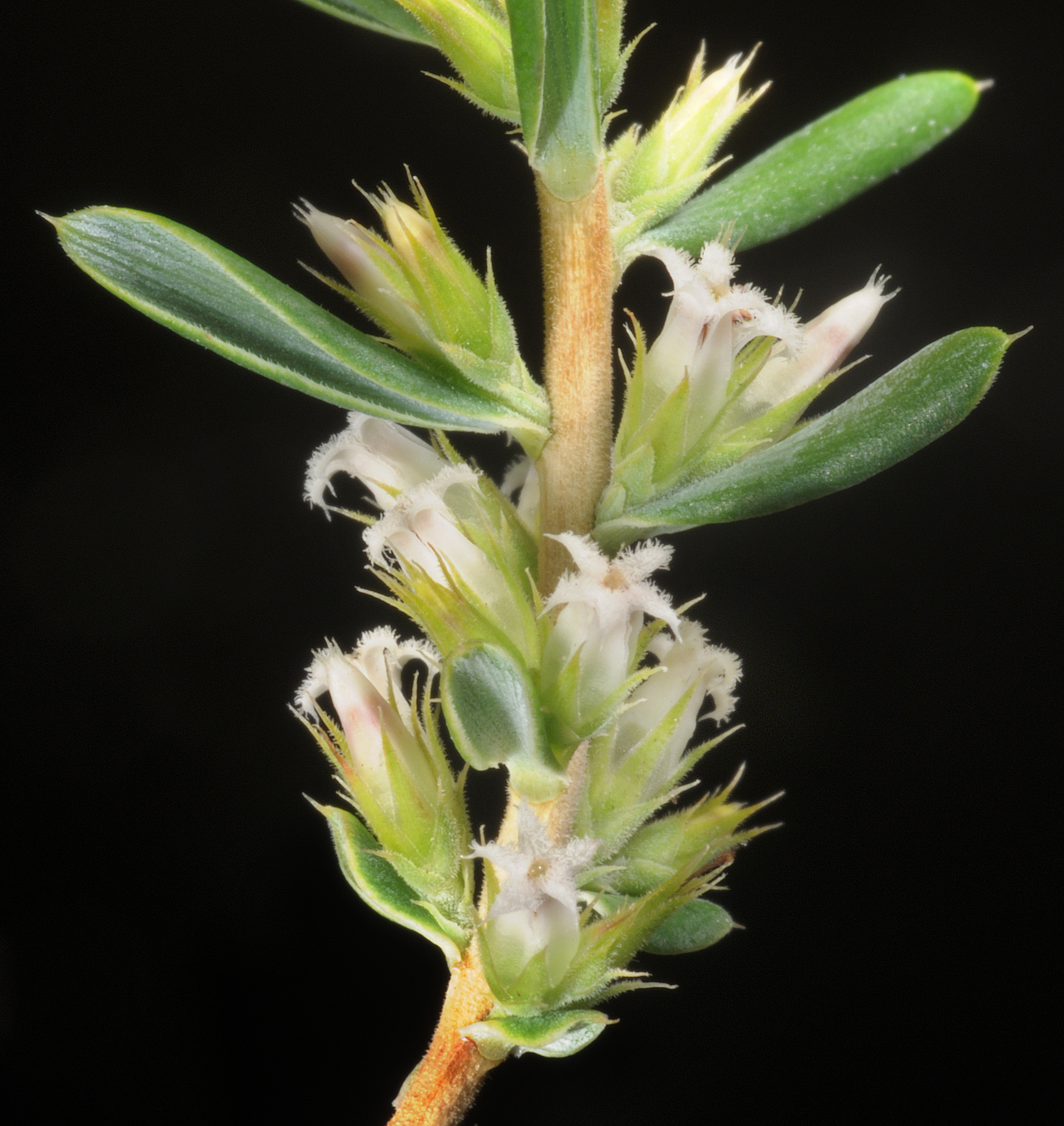

Scientific classification
- Kingdom: Plantae
- Clade: Tracheophytes
- Clade: Angiosperms
- Clade: Eudicots
- Clade: Asterids
- Order: Ericales
- Family: Ericaceae
- Genus: Styphelia
- Species: S. glaucifolia

Binomial name
- Styphelia glaucifolia (W.Fitzg.) Hislop
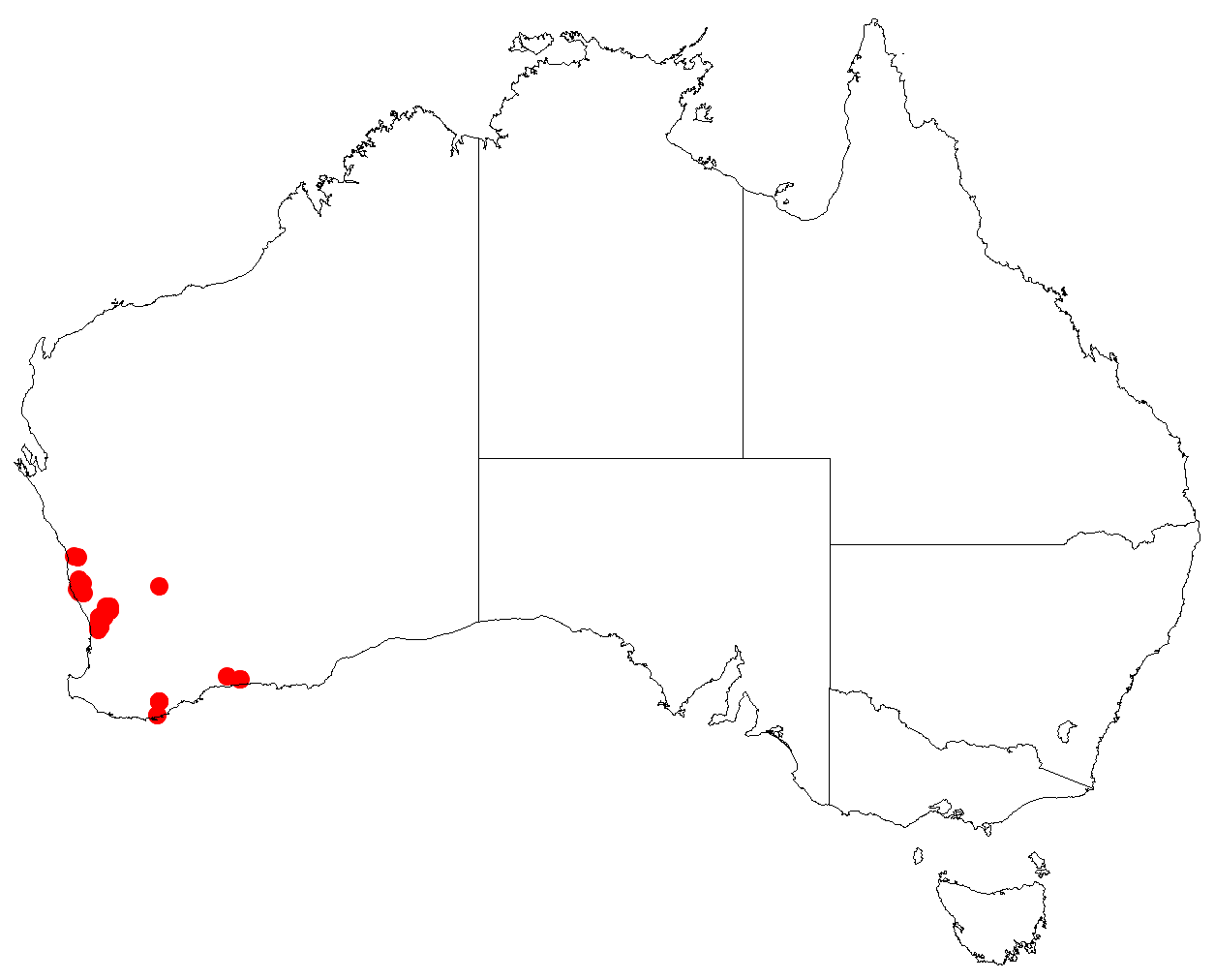
- Occurrence data from AVH

Synonyms
- Leucopogon glaucifolius W.Fitzg.

= Styphelia glaucifolia =

Species of shrub

Styphelia glaucifolia is a species of flowering plant in the family Ericaceae and is endemic to the south-west of Western Australia. It is an erect or spreading shrub with linear, sharply-pointed leaves, and white, tube-shaped flowers.

== Description ==
Styphelia glaucifolia is an erect or spreading shrub that typically grows to a height of less than 30 cm (12 in) and has branches covered with fine hairs. Its leaves are glabrous, linear, 8.5–12.7 mm (0.33–0.50 in) long and sharply pointed. The flowers are borne in leaf axils in groups of mostly three on a short peduncle with small bracts and egg-shaped bracteoles less than half as long as the sepals. The sepals are about 3 mm (0.12 in) long and the petals white and about 4.7 mm (0.19 in) long, forming a tube with lobes shorter than the sepals and with the ends rolled under. The fruit is an almost spherical drupe about 3.7 mm (0.15 in) long.

== Taxonomy ==
Styphelia glaucifolia was first formally described in 1903 by William Vincent Fitzgerald in the Proceedings of the Linnean Society of New South Wales from specimens collected near Midland Junction in 1902. In 2020, Michael Clyde Hislop transferred the species to Styphelia as S. glaucifolia in Australian Systematic Botany. The specific epithet (glaucifolia) means "glaucous-leaved".

== Distribution ==
This species of styphelia occurs in the Geraldton Sandplains, Jarrah Forest and Swan Coastal Plain bioregions of south-western Western Australia.
