= Persoonia pungens =

Conservation status
- Priority Three — Poorly Known Taxa (DEC)

Scientific classification
- Kingdom: Plantae
- Clade: Tracheophytes
- Clade: Angiosperms
- Clade: Eudicots
- Order: Proteales
- Family: Proteaceae
- Genus: Persoonia
- Species: P. pungens

Binomial name
- Persoonia pungens W.Fitzg.

Species of flowering plant

Persoonia pungens is a species of flowering plant in the family Proteaceae and is endemic to the south-west of Western Australia. It is an erect to spreading or low-lying shrub with densely hairy young branchlets, twisted elliptic to oblong, sharply-pointed leaves, and glabrous, bright yellow flowers borne in groups of up to five.

== Description ==
Persoonia pungens is an erect to spreading or low-lying shrub that typically grows to a height of 20–80 cm (7.9–31.5 in) with smooth, mottled bark and young branchlets that are densely covered with greyish hair when young. The leaves are elliptic to oblong, twisted through one complete turn, 5–15 mm (0.20–0.59 in) long and 1–5 mm (0.039–0.197 in) wide with a sharply-pointed tip. The flowers are arranged in groups of up to five along a rachis up to 5 mm (0.20 in) long, each flower on a pedicel 1–3 mm (0.039–0.118 in) long, with a leaf or a scale leaf at the base. The tepals are bright yellow and glabrous on the outside, 9–12.5 mm (0.35–0.49 in) long. Flowering occurs from September to December and the fruit is an oval drupe 6–8 mm (0.24–0.31 in) long and 5–6.5 mm (0.20–0.26 in) wide.

== Taxonomy ==
Persoonia pungens was first formally described in 1912 by William Vincent Fitzgerald in the Journal of Botany, British and Foreign.

== Distribution and habitat ==
This geebung grows in heath from near Coorow to Kellerberrin in the Avon Wheatbelt and Geraldton Sandplains biogeographic regions in the south-west of Western Australia.

== Conservation status ==
Persoonia pungens is classified as "Priority Three" by the Government of Western Australia Department of Parks and Wildlife meaning that it is poorly known and known from only a few locations but is not under imminent threat.
