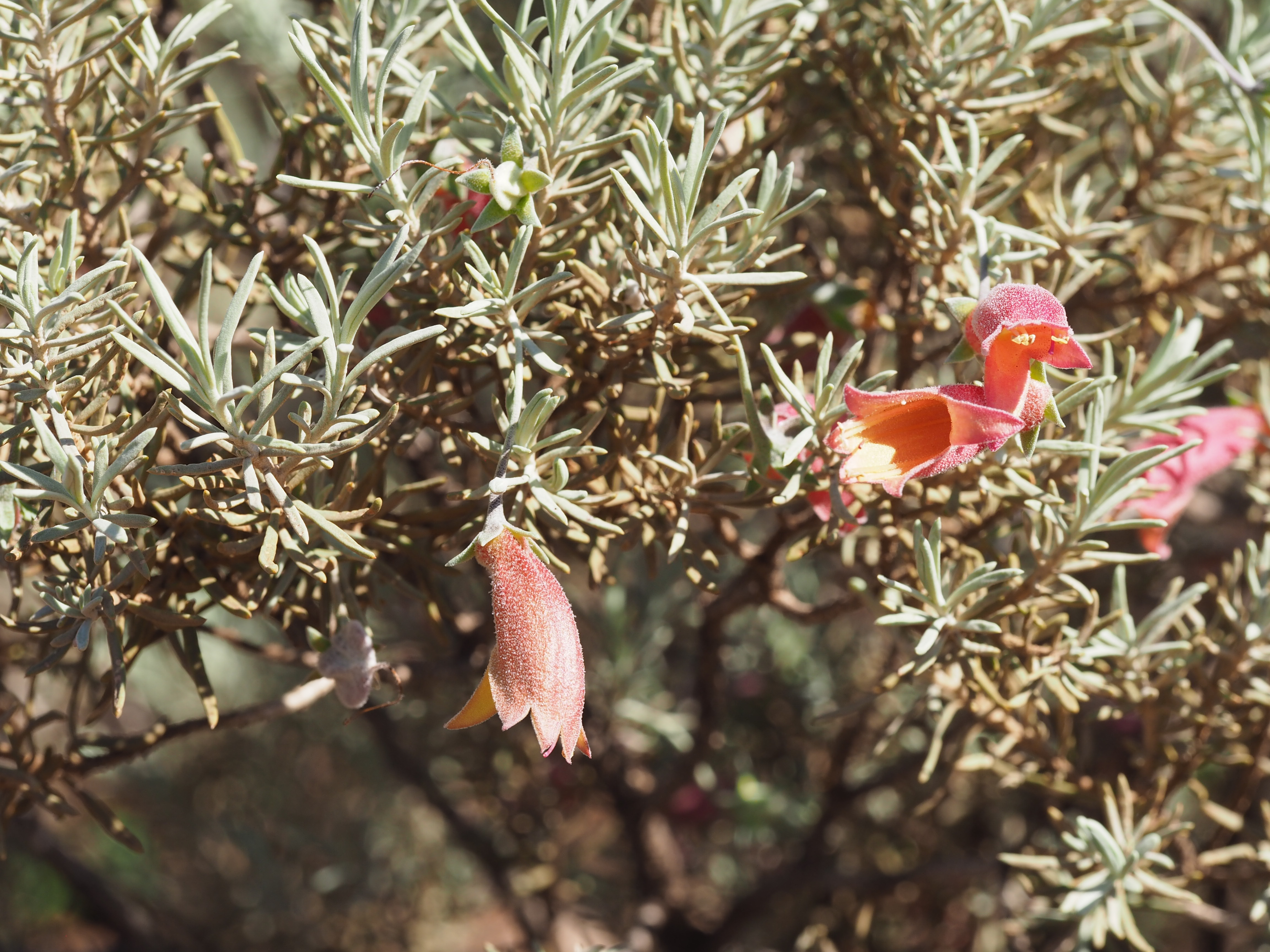
- Leaves and flowers

Scientific classification
- Kingdom: Plantae
- Clade: Tracheophytes
- Clade: Angiosperms
- Clade: Eudicots
- Clade: Asterids
- Order: Lamiales
- Family: Scrophulariaceae
- Genus: Eremophila
- Species: E. pterocarpa
- Subspecies: E. p. subsp. acicularis

Trinomial name
- Eremophila pterocarpa subsp. acicularis Robert Chinnock

= Eremophila pterocarpa subsp. acicularis =

Subspecies of flowering plant

Eremophila pterocarpa subsp. acicularis is a plant in the figwort family, Scrophulariaceae and is endemic to Western Australia. It is a locally common shrub with grey leaves and sepals and a red flower tube which is orange inside.

== Description ==
Eremophila pterocarpa subspecies acicularis is a shrub growing to 0.6–1.8 metres (2–6 ft) high. The branches have raised lumps, especially near their ends and the leaves are narrow, linear to needle-like, 10–18 millimetres (0.4–0.7 in) long and 1–2 millimetres (0.04–0.08 in) wide. The leaves and stems are covered with powder-like short, matted hairs. Unlike those in subspecies pterocarpa, the leaf bases are not twisted

The flowers are brick-red on their outer surface, orange inside the petal tube, lack spots and are arranged singly in the leaf axils on a stalk which is 10–16 millimetres (0.4–0.6 in) long. There are 5 sepals which are narrow egg-shaped to triangular and of approximately equal lengths. The petals, which give the flowers their colour are 14–24 millimetres (0.6–0.9 in) long and joined in a tube with 5 lobes at the end. As with the leaves, the sepals and petals have a dusty covering of short, fine hairs. Flowering occurs between June and July and is followed by fruits which are flattened and dry with papery wings.

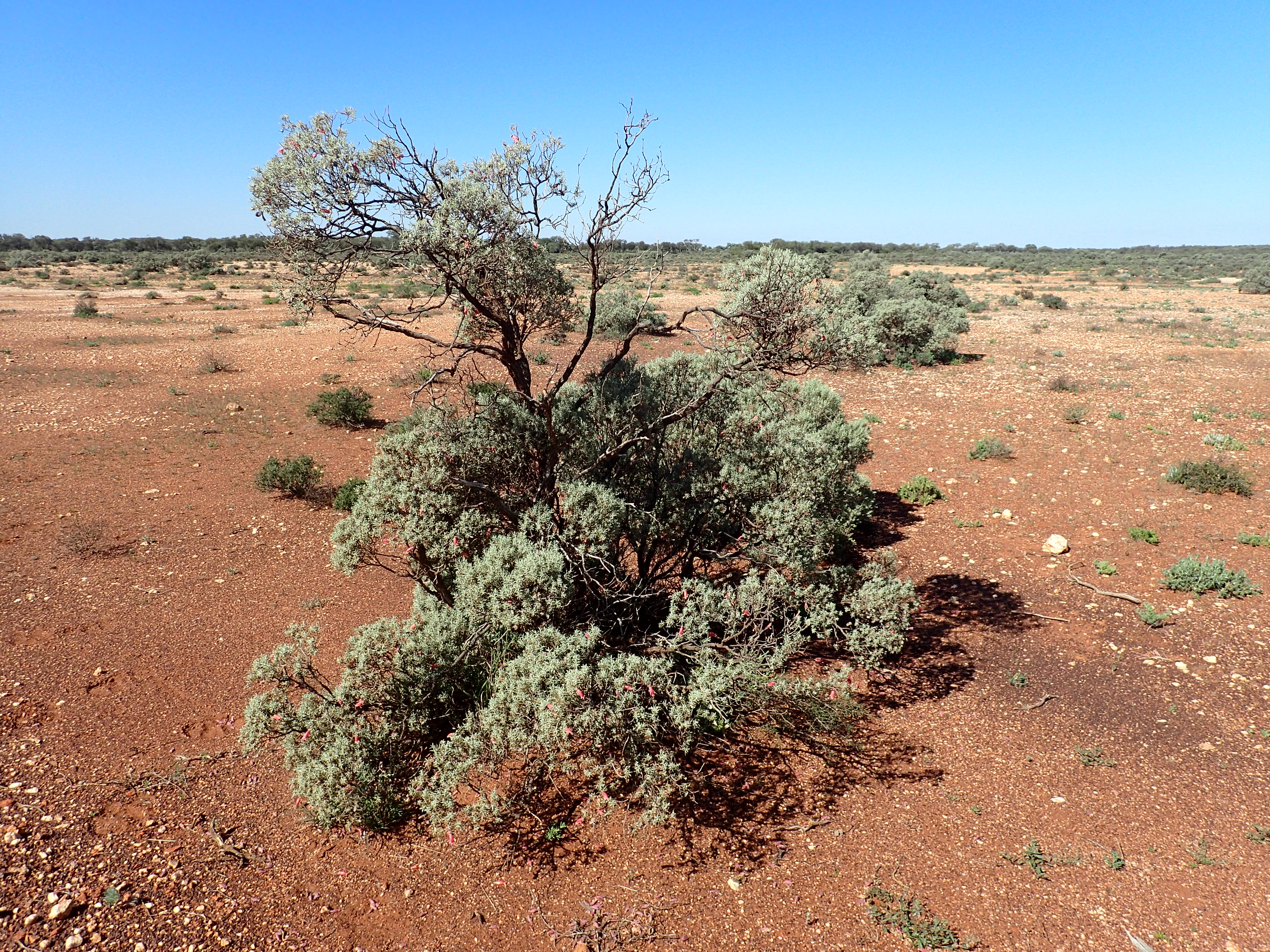
North of Wiluna

== Taxonomy and naming ==
The species was first formally described in 1904 by William Vincent Fitzgerald in the Journal of the Royal Society of Western Australia. When Robert Chinnock reviewed the genus, he recognised the subspecies - E. pterocarpa subsp. acicularis.

== Distribution and habitat ==
Subspecies acicularis occurs between Wiluna and Meekatharra areas where it grows in places that are more rocky or saline than for subspecies pterocarpa.

== Conservation ==
Subspecies acicularis is listed as "not threatened" by the Government of Western Australia Department of Parks and Wildlife.
