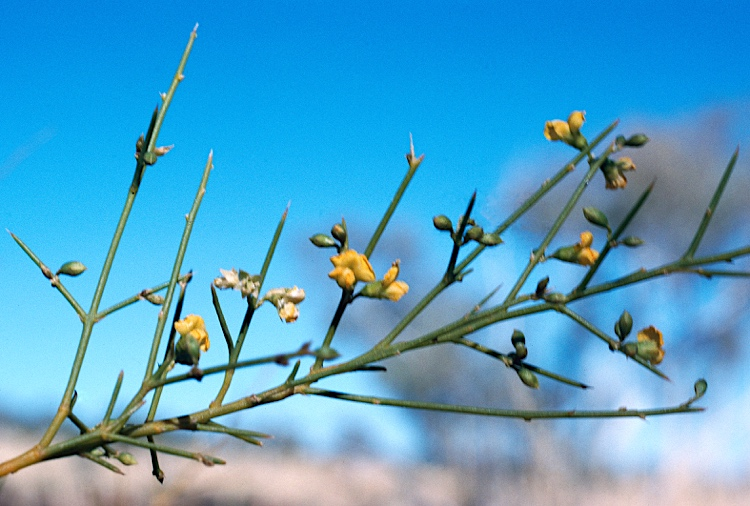
- In Karijini National Park

Scientific classification
- Kingdom: Plantae
- Clade: Tracheophytes
- Clade: Angiosperms
- Clade: Eudicots
- Clade: Rosids
- Order: Fabales
- Family: Fabaceae
- Subfamily: Faboideae
- Genus: Jacksonia
- Species: J. aculeata

Binomial name
- Jacksonia aculeata W.Fitzg.

= Jacksonia aculeata =

Species of legume

Jacksonia aculeata is a species of flowering plant in the family Fabaceae and is endemic to the northern Australia. It is a spreading shrub with sharply-pointed, hairy, short side branches, leaves reduced to scales, lemon-yellow flowers, and woody, hairy pods.

== Description ==
Jacksonia aculeata is a sturdy, spreading shrub that typically grows up to 0.15–1 m (5.9 in – 3 ft 3.4 in) high and 0.7–2 m (2 ft 4 in – 6 ft 7 in) wide, its branches greyish-green with sharply-pointed phylloclades about 0.7–1.5 mm (0.028–0.059 in) wide. Its leaves are reduced to narrowly egg-shaped scales, 1.3–3.0 mm (0.051–0.118 in) long and 0.6–1.0 mm (0.024–0.039 in) wide. The flowers are scattered along the branches in the axils of scale leaves on a pedicel 1.7–1.3 mm (0.067–0.051 in) long. There are narrowly egg-shaped bracteoles 0.6–1.7 mm (0.024–0.067 in) long on the pedicels. The floral tube is 0.6–1.1 mm (0.024–0.043 in) long and the sepals are membranous, the upper lobes 3.4–4 mm (0.13–0.16 in) long and 1.4–2.7 mm (0.055–0.106 in) wide, the lower lobes 3.2–5 mm (0.13–0.20 in) long, 1.0–1.5 mm (0.039–0.059 in) wide and fused at the base. The petals are lemon-yellow without markings, the standard petal 2.7–3.4 mm (0.11–0.13 in) long, the wings 2.8–3.6 mm (0.11–0.14 in) long, and the keel 2.5–2.9 mm (0.098–0.114 in) long. The stamens have pink filaments 1.9–3.3 mm (0.075–0.130 in) long. Flowering occurs from April to October, and the fruit is a woody, hairy pod 3.5–4.2 mm (0.14–0.17 in) long and 1.8–2 mm (0.071–0.079 in) wide.

== Taxonomy ==
Jacksonia aculeata was first formally described in 1918 by William Vincent Fitzgerald in Journal and Proceedings of the Royal Society of Western Australia from specimens he collected near the Fitzroy River. The specific epithet (aculeata) means 'prickly' referring to the scale leaves.

== Distribution and habitat ==
Jacksonia aculeata grows on sand dunes and sandplains from the eastern Pilbara to the Great Sandy and Tanami Deserts in northern Western Australia and the Northern Territory.
