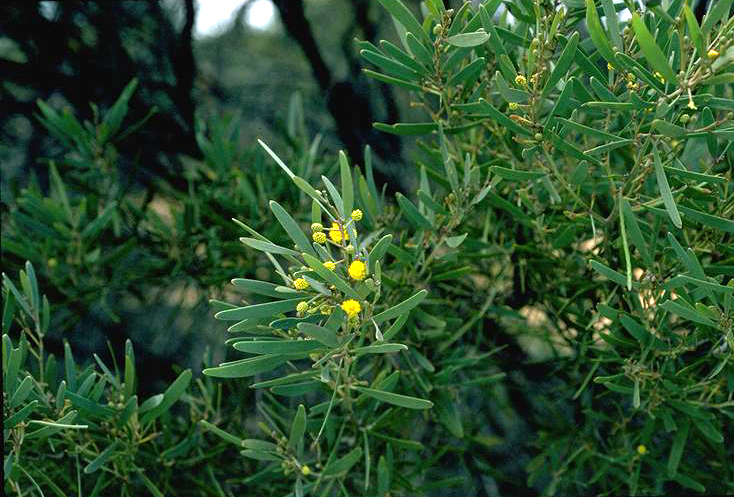
- Near Northampton

Scientific classification
- Kingdom: Plantae
- Clade: Tracheophytes
- Clade: Angiosperms
- Clade: Eudicots
- Clade: Rosids
- Order: Fabales
- Family: Fabaceae
- Subfamily: Caesalpinioideae
- Clade: Mimosoid clade
- Genus: Acacia
- Species: A. duriuscula

Binomial name
- Acacia duriuscula W.Fitzg.
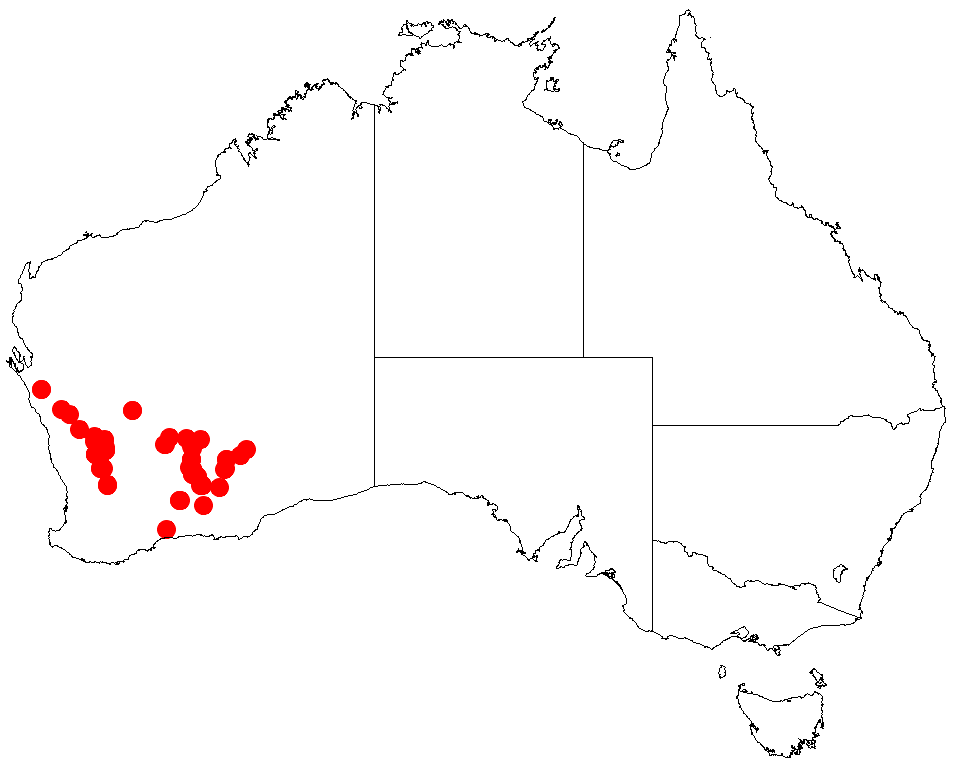
- Occurrence data from AVH

Synonyms
- Racosperma duriusculum (W.Fitzg.) Pedley

= Acacia duriuscula =

Species of legume

Acacia duriuscula is a species of flowering plant in the family Fabaceae and is endemic to the south-west of Western Australia. It is a shrub or tree with glabrous branchlets, leathery, linear phyllodes, spherical heads of golden yellow flowers, and linear, firmly papery pods slightly curved and slightly raised over the seeds.

== Description ==
Acacia duriuscula is a resinous shrub or tree that typically grows to a height of 0.7–3 m (2 ft 4 in – 9 ft 10 in) and has glabrous branchlets. Its phyllodes are ascending to erect, linear to linear-elliptic, straight to slightly curved, leathery, 15–95 mm (0.59–3.74 in) long and 1–4 mm (0.039–0.157 in) wide with the midrib slightly more evident than the other veins. The flowers are borne in one or two spherical heads in axils, on peduncles 2–5 mm (0.079–0.197 in) long, each head 3.5–4.0 mm (0.14–0.16 in) long with 19 to 26 golden yellow flowers. Flowering occurs from July to October, and the pods are linear, up to 60 mm (2.4 in) long, 3–4 mm (0.12–0.16 in) wide, slightly raised over the seeds, firmly papery and slightly curved. The seeds are oblong, 3.0–3.5 mm (0.12–0.14 in) long, glossy mottled brown to black with an aril on the end.

== Taxonomy ==
Acacia duriuscula was first formally described in 1904 by William Vincent Fitzgerald in the Journal of the West Australian Natural History Society from specimens collected in the Coolgardie district by Edmund Kelso. The specific epithet (duriuscula) means 'somewhat hard or harsh'.

== Distribution and habitat ==
This species of wattle grows in sand on plains and near granite outcrops in scattered locations from near Mullewa and Paynes Find to Tammin and Cardunia Rocks east of Coolgardie, and near Bromus south of Norseman, in the Avon Wheatbelt, Coolgardie, Great Victoria Desert, Murchison and Yalgoo bioregions of south-western Western Australia.

== Conservation status ==
Acacia duriuscula is listed as "not threatened" by the Government of Western Australia Department of Biodiversity, Conservation and Attractions.

== See also ==
- List of Acacia species
