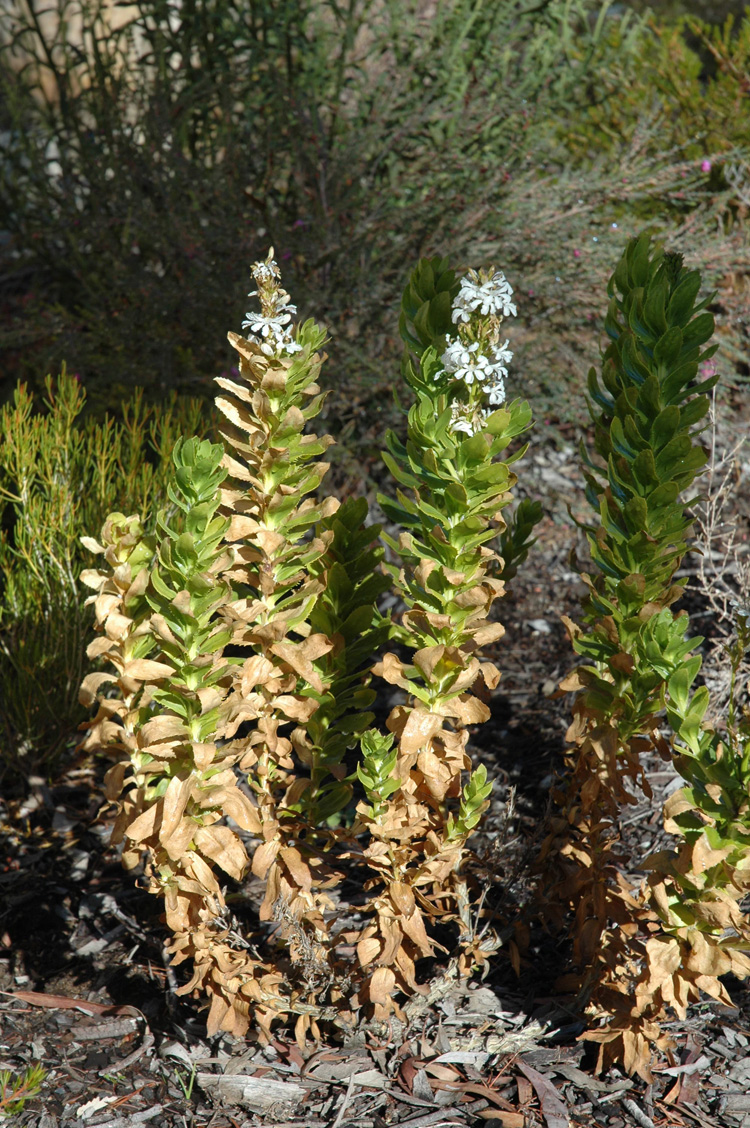
- In the ANBG

Scientific classification
- Kingdom: Plantae
- Clade: Tracheophytes
- Clade: Angiosperms
- Clade: Eudicots
- Clade: Asterids
- Order: Asterales
- Family: Goodeniaceae
- Genus: Goodenia
- Species: G. decursiva

Binomial name
- Goodenia decursiva W.Fitzg.

= Goodenia decursiva =

Species of plant

Goodenia decursiva is a species of flowering plant in the family Goodeniaceae and endemic to the south coast of Western Australia. It is an erect shrub with dense, more or less stem-clasping, toothed, elliptic to egg-shaped leaves almost obscuring the stem, and compact thyrses of white flowers.

== Description ==
Goodenia decursiva is an erect, glabrous shrub that typically grows to a height of 1 m (3 ft 3 in). The leaves are elliptic to egg-shaped and toothed, 10–35 mm (0.39–1.38 in) long, 8–12 mm (0.31–0.47 in) wide, more or less stem-clasping and densely arranged up the stem and almost obscuring it. The flowers are arranged in compact thyrses up to 100 mm (3.9 in) long on a peduncle up to 100 mm (3.9 in) long, with linear bracts up to 50 mm (2.0 in) long at the base, each flower on a pedicel 1–2 mm (0.039–0.079 in) long. The sepals are linear, about 9 mm (0.35 in) long and the corolla is white and 15–18 mm (0.59–0.71 in) long. The lobes of the corolla are about 8 mm (0.31 in) long with wings about 2 mm (0.079 in) wide. Flowering occurs from September to January and the fruit is a cylindrical capsule about 9 mm (0.35 in) long.

== Taxonomy and naming ==
Goodenia decursiva was first formally described in 1905 by William Vincent Fitzgerald in the Journal of the West Australian Natural History Society from material collected in "sandy ground on the side of granite hill, Esperance, October, 1903" by Cecil Andrews. The specific epithet (decursiva) means "decurrent", referring to the leaves.

== Distribution and habitat ==
This goodenia grows in sandy soil on granite outcrops and hills, mostly near the sea, along the south coast of Western Australia between Esperance and Israelite Bay in the Esperance Plains and Mallee biogeographic regions.

== Conservation status ==
Goddenia decursiva is classified as "not threatened" by the Department of Environment and Conservation (Western Australia).
