= Acacia sericocarpa =

Scientific classification
- Kingdom: Plantae
- Clade: Tracheophytes
- Clade: Angiosperms
- Clade: Eudicots
- Clade: Rosids
- Order: Fabales
- Family: Fabaceae
- Subfamily: Caesalpinioideae
- Clade: Mimosoid clade
- Genus: Acacia
- Species: A. sericocarpa

Binomial name
- Acacia sericocarpa W.Fitzg.
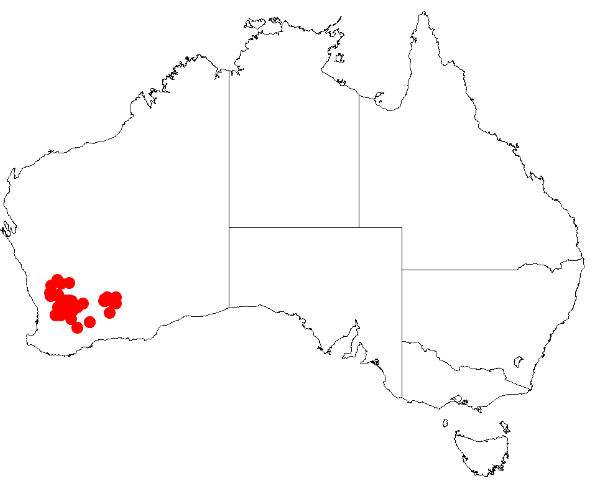
- Occurrence data from AVH

Species of legume

Habit about 2 km west of Cunderdin

Acacia sericocarpa is a shrub of the genus Acacia and the subgenus Phyllodineae that is endemic to south western Australia.

== Description ==
The spreading shrub typically grows to a height of 0.4 to 2.0 metres (1.3 to 6.6 ft). It can have a rounded habit and a rather dense crown with hairy branchlets. Like most species of Acacia it has phyllodes rather than true leaves. The patent to undulate, coriaceous green phyllodes are usually slightly asymmetric and have an obovate, ovate or elliptic shape with a length of 1 to 2.5 cm (0.39 to 0.98 in) and a width of 5 to 12 mm (0.20 to 0.47 in) with one main nerve per face. It blooms from August to September and produces yellow flowers. The simple inflorescences are found occurring in pairs in the axils and have spherical flower-heads with a diameter of 4 to 5 mm (0.16 to 0.20 in) conraining 15 to 24 mid-golden coloured flowers. Following flowering seed pods form that are twisted to spirally coiled with a length of approximately 1 cm (0.39 in) and a width of 2.5 to 3 mm (0.098 to 0.118 in). The thinly crustaceous seed pods are covered in woolly hairs and contain shiny brown seeds with an elliptic shape and a length of 2 to 2.5 mm (0.079 to 0.098 in) and a bright orange aril.

== Taxonomy ==
The species was first formally described by the botanist William Vincent Fitzgerald in 1904 as a part of the work Additions to the West Australian Flora as published in the Journal of the West Australian Natural History Society. It was reclassified as Racosperma sericocarpum in 2003 by Leslie Pedley than transferred back to genus Acacia in 2006.

== Distribution ==
It is native to an area in the Wheatbelt and Goldfields-Esperance regions of Western Australia where it is commonly situated on flats growing in loamy or sandy-clay soils. The distribution of the shrub extends from Wyalkathem in the north down to around Corrigin and Beverly in the south to around Queen Victoria Rock in the east usually as a part of open Eucalyptus woodland or mallee woodland communities or shrublands of Melaleuca uncinata and species of Casuarina.

== See also ==
- List of Acacia species
