= Eucalyptus fitzgeraldii =

Broad-leaved box

Conservation status
- Priority Two — Poorly Known Taxa (DEC)

Scientific classification
- Kingdom: Plantae
- Clade: Tracheophytes
- Clade: Angiosperms
- Clade: Eudicots
- Clade: Rosids
- Order: Myrtales
- Family: Myrtaceae
- Genus: Eucalyptus
- Species: E. fitzgeraldii

Binomial name
- Eucalyptus fitzgeraldii Blakely

Species of eucalyptus

Eucalyptus fitzgeraldii, commonly known as the broad-leaved box or the paper-barked box, is a tree that is endemic to Western Australia. It has rough, flaky bark, flower buds arranged in groups of seven and bell-shaped to urn-shaped fruit.

== Description ==
Eucalyptus fitzgeraldii is a tree that typically grows to a height of 5 to 15 metres (16 to 49 ft) and has rough, grey, fibrous or flaky bark that is shed in papery flakes. Adult leaves are egg-shaped to more or less round, glossy when fresh, up to 100 mm (3.9 in) long and 120 mm (4.7 in) wide on a petiole up to 40 mm (1.6 in) long. The flower buds are arranged in groups of seven on a peduncle 10–15 mm (0.39–0.59 in) long, the individual buds on pedicels about 5 mm (0.20 in) long. Mature buds have a conical to bell-shaped floral cup 5–6 mm (0.20–0.24 in) long and wide with a conical to hemispherical operculum 3–4 mm (0.12–0.16 in) long and 5–6 mm (0.20–0.24 in) wide. Flowering occurs between August and September and the flowers are whitish cream.

== Taxonomy ==
Eucalyptus fitzgeraldii was first formally described in 1934 by William Blakely from a specimen collected between Tabletop Mountain and the Artesian Range near the Charnley River by William Vincent Fitzgerald. The specific epithet (fitzgeraldii) honours the collector of the type specimen.

== Distribution ==
The broad-leaved box is found on rocky hillsides and plains in the northern Kimberley region of Western Australia where it grows in clay soils around basalt or dolerite.

== Conservation status ==
This eucalypt is classified as "Priority Two" by the Western Australian Government Department of Parks and Wildlife meaning that it is poorly known and from only one or a few locations.

== See also ==
- List of Eucalyptus species
