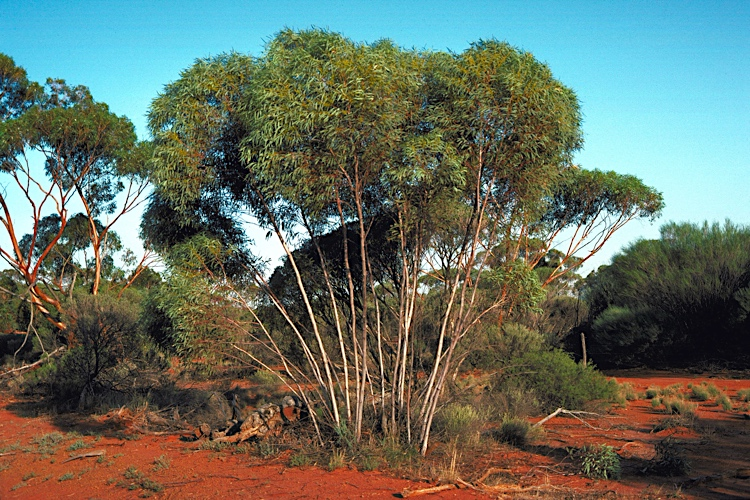

Conservation status
- Vulnerable (IUCN 3.1)

Scientific classification
- Kingdom: Plantae
- Clade: Tracheophytes
- Clade: Angiosperms
- Clade: Eudicots
- Clade: Rosids
- Order: Myrtales
- Family: Myrtaceae
- Genus: Eucalyptus
- Species: E. subangusta

Binomial name
- Eucalyptus subangusta (Blakely) Brooker & Hopper

Synonyms
- Eucalyptus redunca var. subangusta Blakely

= Eucalyptus subangusta =

Species of eucalyptus

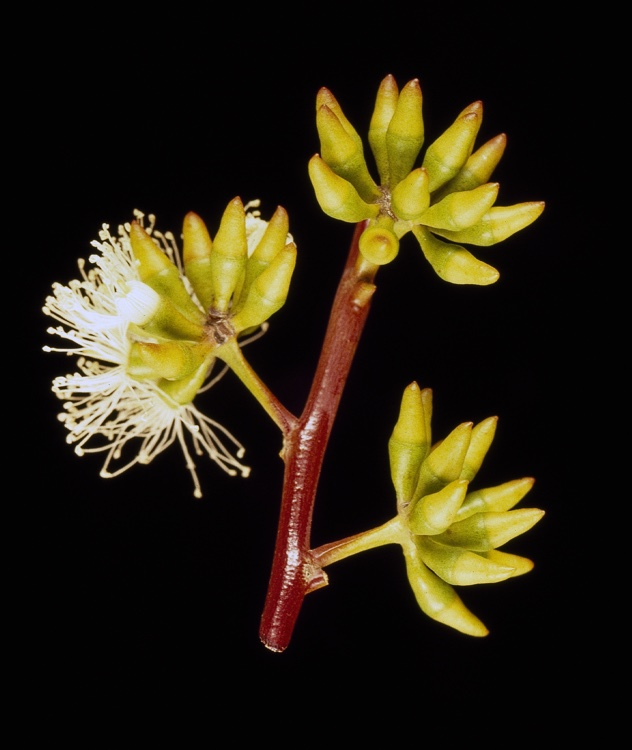
Flower buds

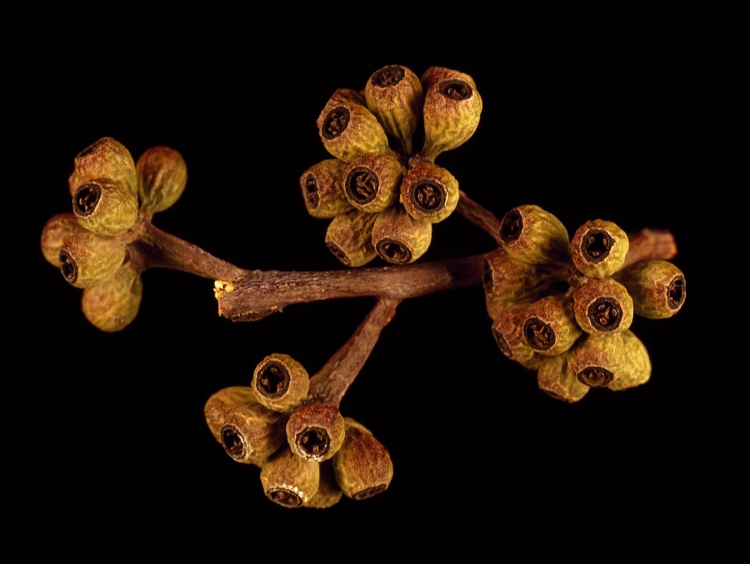
Fruit

Eucalyptus subangusta is a species of tree, mallee or mallet that is endemic to the southwest of Western Australia. It has smooth bark, narrow lance-shaped leaves, flower buds in groups of up to nineteen, white flowers and cup-shaped to barrel-shaped fruit.

== Description ==
Eucalyptus subangusta is a tree, a mallee or a mallet (depending on subspecies) that typically grows to a height of 2–9 m (6 ft 7 in – 29 ft 6 in) and has smooth grey to brownish or pink bark. Young plants and coppice regrowth have dull green leaves that are 50–95 mm (2.0–3.7 in) long and 15–40 mm (0.59–1.57 in) wide. Adult leaves are the same shade of dull green to greyish on both sides, narrow lance-shaped, 45–120 mm (1.8–4.7 in) long and 6–18 mm (0.24–0.71 in) wide, tapering to a petiole 5–18 mm (0.20–0.71 in) long. The flower buds are arranged in leaf axils in groups of between nine and seventeen on an unbranched peduncle 5–15 mm (0.20–0.59 in) long, the individual buds on pedicels 1–3 mm (0.039–0.118 in) long. Mature buds are spindle-shaped to cylindrical, 6–10 mm (0.24–0.39 in) long and 2–4 mm (0.079–0.157 in) wide with a narrow conical to oblong operculum. Flowering occurs in most months and the flowers are white. The fruit is a woody, cup-shaped to barrel-shaped capsule 4–6 mm (0.16–0.24 in) long and wide with the valves near rim level.

== Taxonomy and naming ==
Eucalyptus redunca var. subangusta was first formally described in 1934 by William Blakely in his book A Key to the Eucalypts from specimens collected by William Vincent Fitzgerald near Cunderdin. In 1991, Ian Brooker and Stephen Hopper raised the variety to species status as Eucalyptus subangusta in the journal Nuytsia. In the same publication, Brooker and Hopper described four subspecies and the names have been accepted by the Australian Plant Census:

- Eucalyptus subangusta subsp. cerina Brooker & Hopper has glaucous seedlings, white, waxy branchlets and a longer, narrower conical operculum;
- Eucalyptus subangusta subsp. pusilla Brooker & Hopper is sometimes a mallet and has dull green leaves and the smallest buds and fruit;
- Eucalyptus subangusta (Blakely) Brooker & Hopper subsp. subangusta is a mallee with non-waxy branchlets, dull green leaves and relatively large buds and fruit;
- Eucalyptus subangusta subsp. virescens Brooker & Hopper has glossy, light green leaves.

== Distribution and habitat ==
Subspecies cerina grows in low woodland, mallee and shrubland in the eastern central wheatbelt between Yelbeni to east of Southern Cross. Subspecies pusilla grows in fine textured, stony soils in the northern wheatbelt, between Wongan Hills, Mullewa and Paynes Find. Subspecies subangusta grows on sandplains and hills, usually on yellow or red sand in low to tall mallee. It is the most widespread and abundant of the four and occurs in the central and northern wheatbelts from north of Kalbarri to south-east of Norseman. Subspecies virescens is only known a few scattered locations in the eastern part of the central wheatbelt between Manmanning and Watheroo.

== Conservation status ==
This eucalypt species and three of its subspecies are classified as "not threatened" by the Western Australian Government Department of Parks and Wildlife but subspecies virescens is classified as "Priority Three" meaning that it is poorly known and known from only a few locations but is not under imminent threat. The IUCN Red List assesses the species as Vulnerable.

== See also ==
- List of Eucalyptus species
