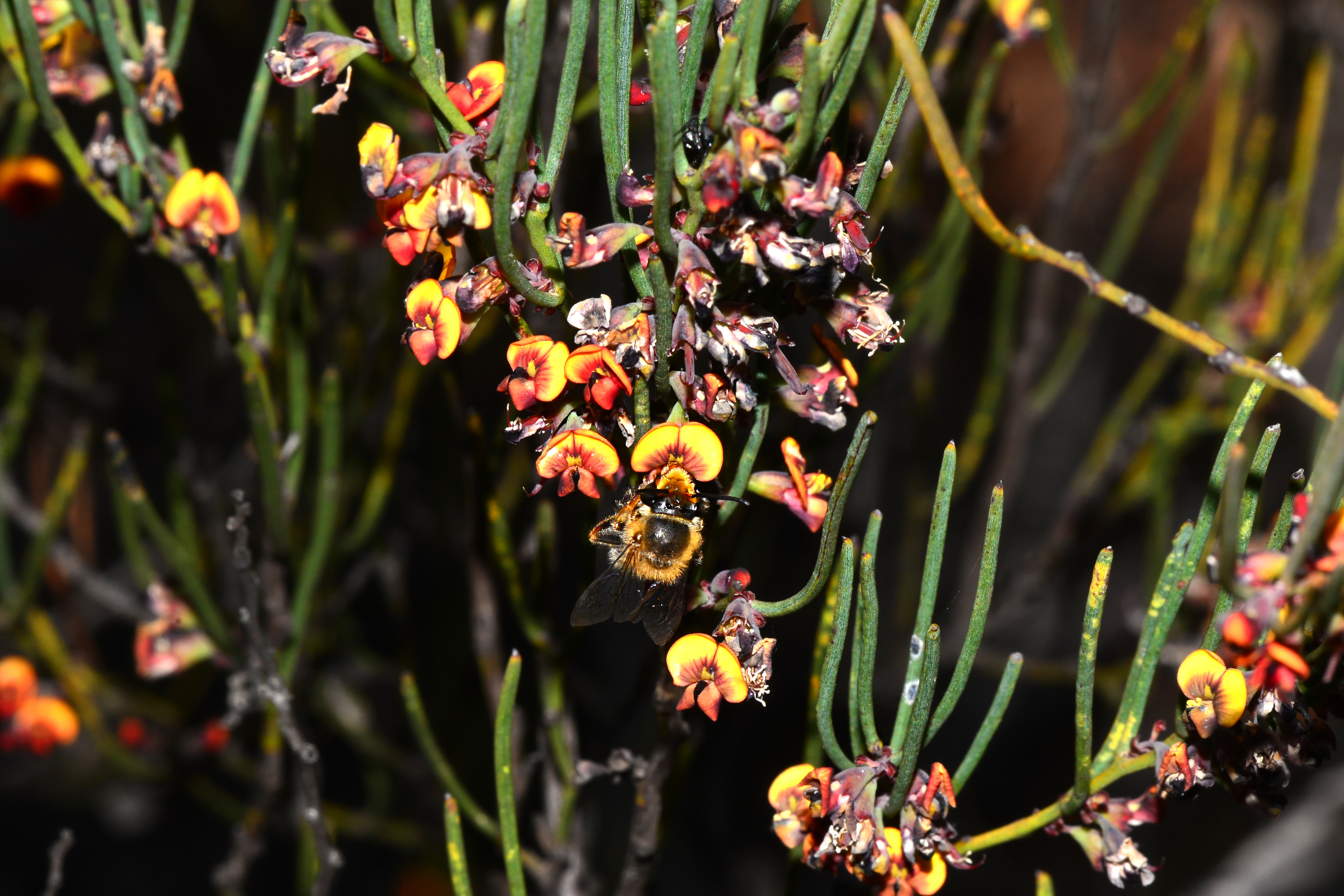

Scientific classification
- Kingdom: Plantae
- Clade: Tracheophytes
- Clade: Angiosperms
- Clade: Eudicots
- Clade: Rosids
- Order: Fabales
- Family: Fabaceae
- Subfamily: Faboideae
- Genus: Daviesia
- Species: D. nematophylla

Binomial name
- Daviesia nematophylla F.Muell. ex Benth.

= Daviesia nematophylla =

Species of flowering plant

Daviesia nematophylla is a species of flowering plant in the family Fabaceae and is endemic to the south-west of Western Australia. It is a dense, erect shrub with glabrous foliage, erect, usually needle-shaped phyllodes, and yellow, orange and dark red flowers.

== Description ==
Daviesia nematophylla is a dense, erect, spreading to ascending shrub, typically growing to a height of 0.4–2 m (1 ft 4 in – 6 ft 7 in) and has glabrous foliage. Its phyllodes are erect, mostly needle-shaped with a small point on the tip, 12–80 mm (0.47–3.15 in) long and about 1 mm (0.039 in) wide. The flowers are arranged singly, in pairs or threes in leaf axils, the groups on a peduncle 0.24–0.5 mm (0.0094–0.0197 in) long, the rachis up to 2 mm (0.079 in) long, each flower on a pedicel 0.75–1.5 mm (0.030–0.059 in) long with bracts about 1 mm (0.039 in) long at the base. The sepals are 3–4 mm (0.12–0.16 in) long and joined at the base, the two upper lobes joined for most of their length, the three lower lobes triangular with curved tips and 0.75–1.0 mm (0.030–0.039 in) long. The standard petal is elliptic with a notched tip, 4.5–5.0 mm (0.18–0.20 in) long, 6.5 mm (0.26 in) wide and yellow with a dark red base around a yellow centre, the wings about 5 mm (0.20 in) long and orange with a dark red base, and the keel 4.5–5.0 mm (0.18–0.20 in) long. Flowering occurs from September to November and the fruit is a triangular, slightly flattened pod 5.5–7.0 mm (0.22–0.28 in) long.

== Taxonomy and naming ==
Daviesia nematophylla was first formally described in 1864 by George Bentham in Flora Australiensis from an unpublished description by Ferdinand von Mueller. The specific epithet (nematophylla) means "thread-like leaved".

== Distribution and habitat ==
This daviesia grows in woodland and heath and is widespread from Coorow to Hopetoun in the Avon Wheatbelt, Coolgardie, Esperance Plains, Jarrah Forest and Mallee biogeographic regions of south-western Western Australia.

== Conservation status ==
Daviesia nematophylla is listed as "not threatened" by the Department of Biodiversity, Conservation and Attractions.
