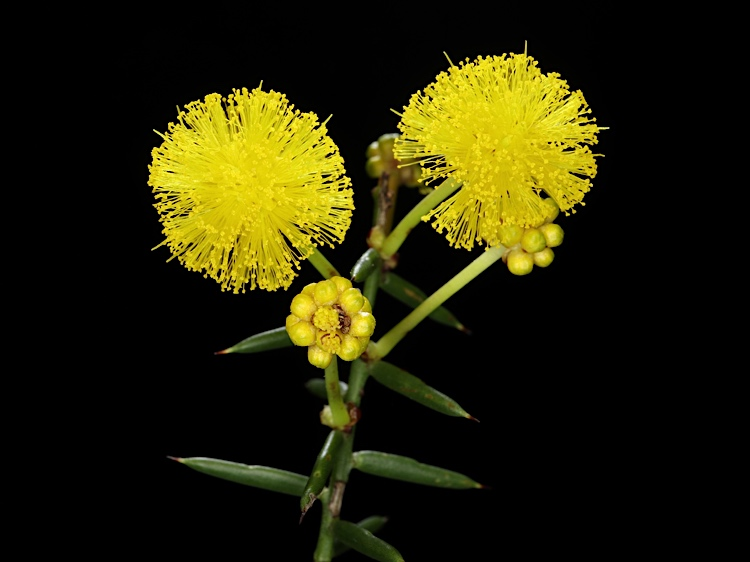
- In the Australian National Botanic Gardens

Scientific classification
- Kingdom: Plantae
- Clade: Tracheophytes
- Clade: Angiosperms
- Clade: Eudicots
- Clade: Rosids
- Order: Fabales
- Family: Fabaceae
- Subfamily: Caesalpinioideae
- Clade: Mimosoid clade
- Genus: Acacia
- Species: A. acuaria

Binomial name
- Acacia acuaria W.Fitzg.
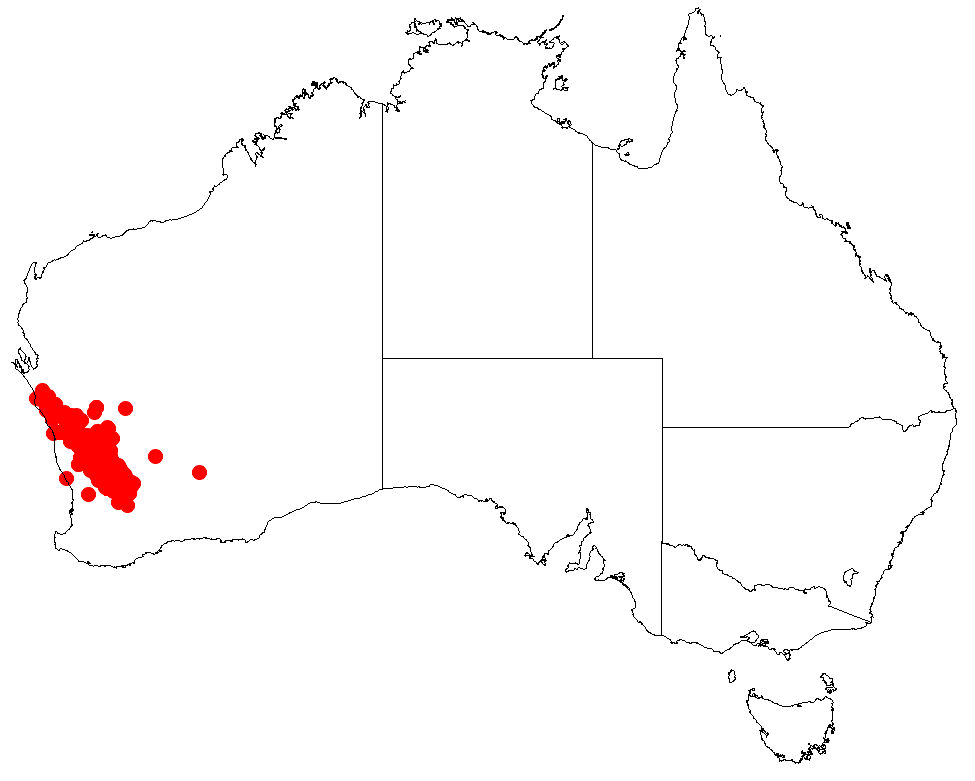
- Occurrence data from AVH

Synonyms
- Racosperma acuarium (W.Fitzg.) Pedley

= Acacia acuaria =

Species of legume

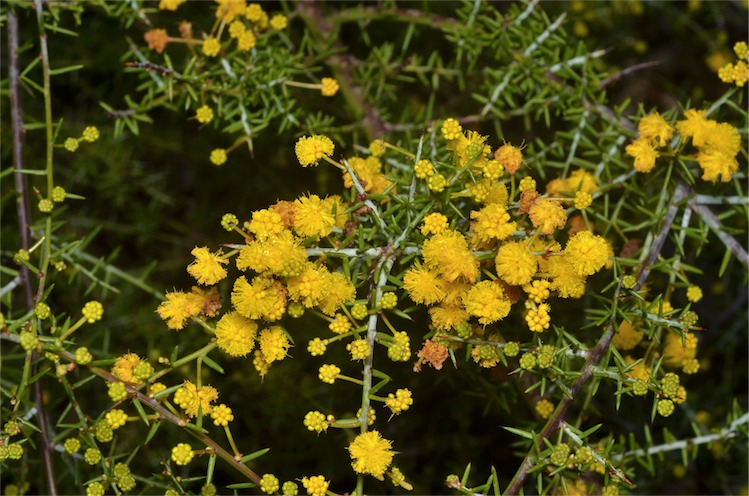
Habit

Acacia acuaria is a species of flowering plant in the family Fabaceae and is endemic to the south-western of Western Australia. It is a rounded or diffuse to spreading, prickly shrub with sharply pointed, rigid, needle-shaped phyllodes, flowers arranged in more or less spherical heads of 14 to 23 flowers, and strongly curved or openly coiled pods up to 50 mm (2.0 in) long.

== Description ==
Acacia acuaria is a rounded or diffuse to spreading shrub that typically grows to a height of 0.6–2 m (2 ft 0 in – 6 ft 7 in) and has more or less spiny branchlets. Its phyllodes are needle-shaped, circular in cross-section, usually glabrous, rigid and sharply pointed, 6–20 mm (0.24–0.79 in) long and 0.5–2 mm (0.020–0.079 in) wide with fused stipules that fall as the phyllodes develop. The flowers are borne in racemes on a peduncle usually 4–12 mm (0.16–0.47 in) long, the heads more or less spherical, with 14 to 23 golden-yellow flowers. Flowering occurs from June to September, and the pods are strongly curved to coiled, up to 50 mm (2.0 in) long and 3.5–5 mm (0.14–0.20 in) wide, dark brown to black, containing elliptic seeds about 3.0 mm (0.12 in) long with an aril about as long as the seed.

== Taxonomy ==
Acacia acuaria was first formally described in 1999 by William Vincent Fitzgerald in the Journal of the West Australian Natural History Society, from specimens he collected in 1903. The specific epithet (acuaria) means "needle-possessing".

== Distribution ==
Acacia acuaria is native to an area in the Mid West and Wheatbelt regions of Western Australia from around Northampton in the north to around Yilgarn in the south east where it is found on sandplains, rises and around salt lakes growing in a variety of soil types as a part of Eucalyptus woodland or mallee scrub communities.

== See also ==
- List of Acacia species
