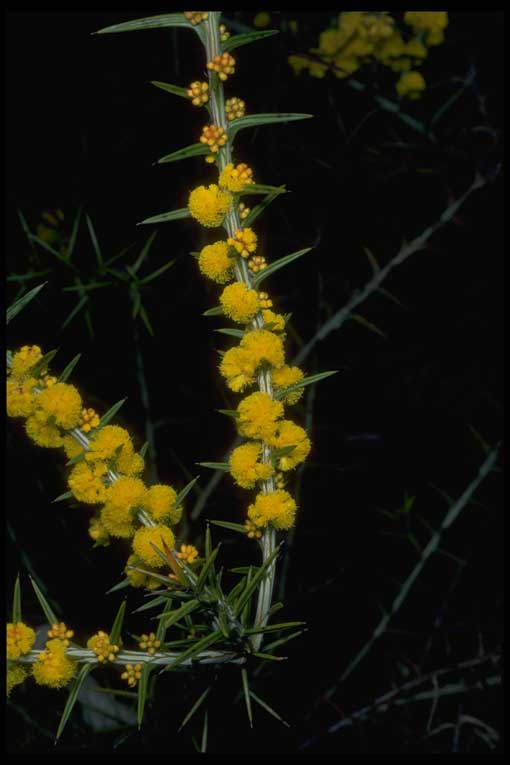
- In the Australian National Botanic Gardens

Scientific classification
- Kingdom: Plantae
- Clade: Embryophytes
- Clade: Tracheophytes
- Clade: Spermatophytes
- Clade: Angiosperms
- Clade: Eudicots
- Clade: Rosids
- Order: Fabales
- Family: Fabaceae
- Subfamily: Caesalpinioideae
- Clade: Mimosoid clade
- Genus: Acacia
- Species: A. unifissilis

Binomial name
- Acacia unifissilis Court
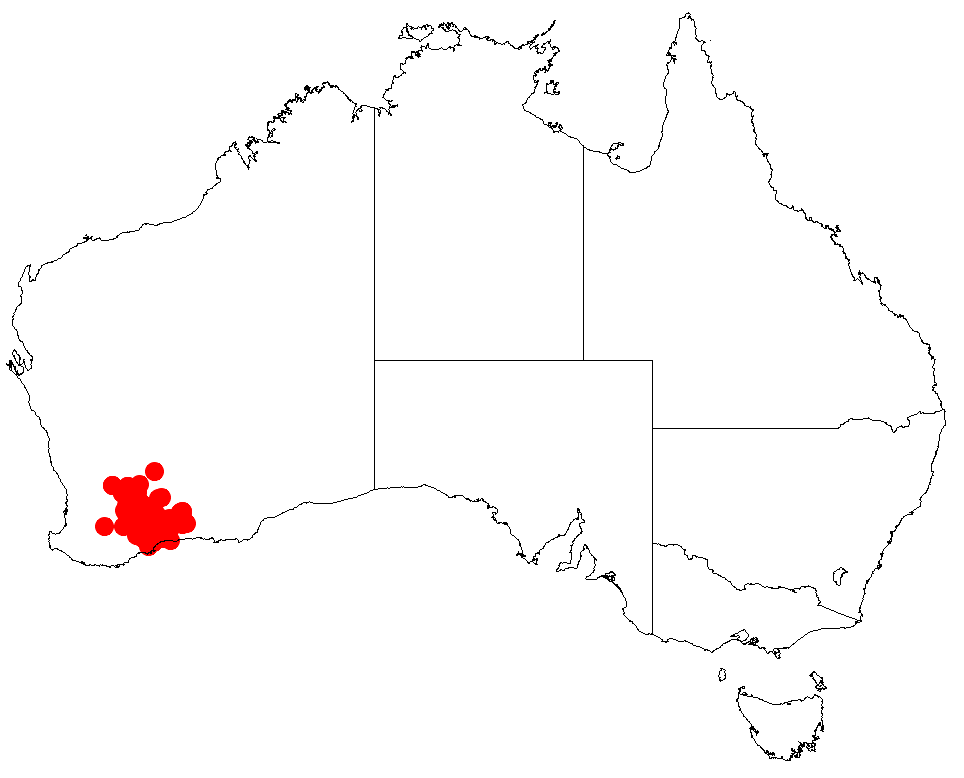
- Occurrence data from AVH

= Acacia unifissilis =

Species of legume

Acacia unifissilis is a shrub of the genus Acacia and the subgenus Phyllodineae. It is native to an area in the Wheatbelt region of Western Australia.

== Ecology ==
The erect prickly shrub typically grows to a height of 0.15 to 0.7 metres (0.5 to 2.3 ft). It blooms from July to September and produces yellow flowers.

== See also ==
- List of Acacia species
