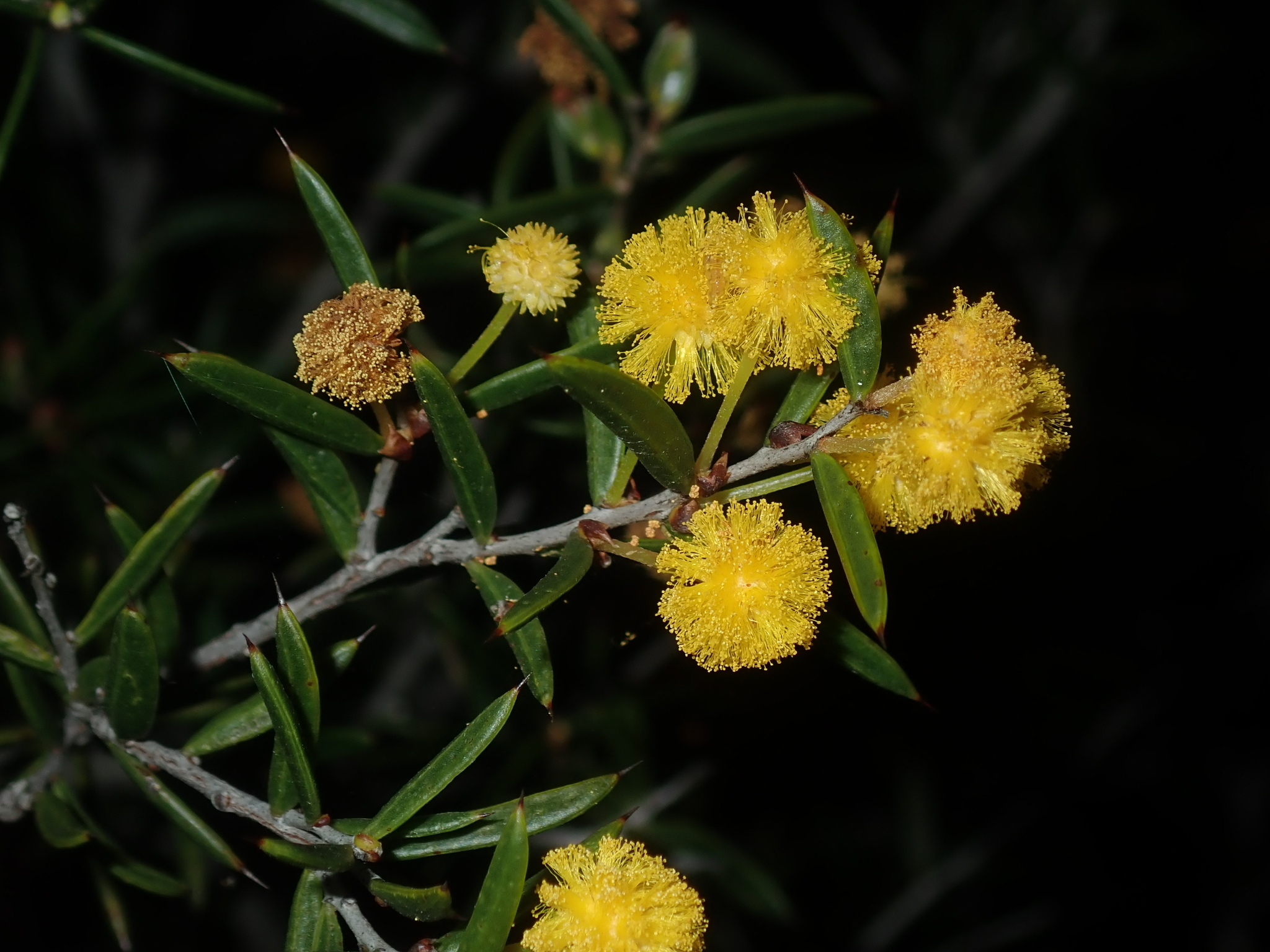

Scientific classification
- Kingdom: Plantae
- Clade: Tracheophytes
- Clade: Angiosperms
- Clade: Eudicots
- Clade: Rosids
- Order: Fabales
- Family: Fabaceae
- Subfamily: Caesalpinioideae
- Clade: Mimosoid clade
- Genus: Acacia
- Species: A. andrewsii

Binomial name
- Acacia andrewsii W.Fitzg.
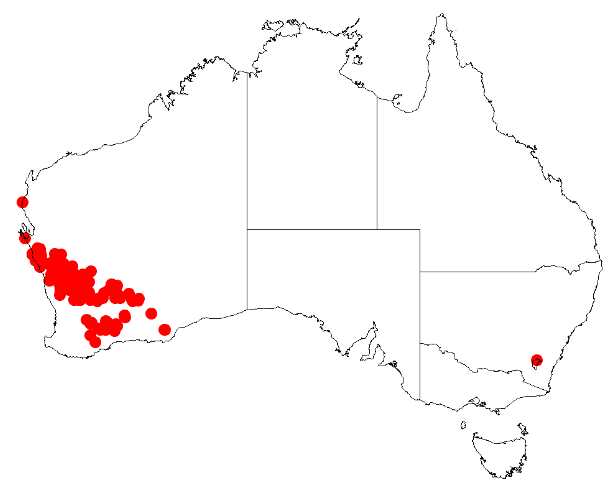
- Occurrence data from AVH

Synonyms
- Racosperma andrewsii (W.Fitzg.) Pedley

= Acacia andrewsii =

Species of legume

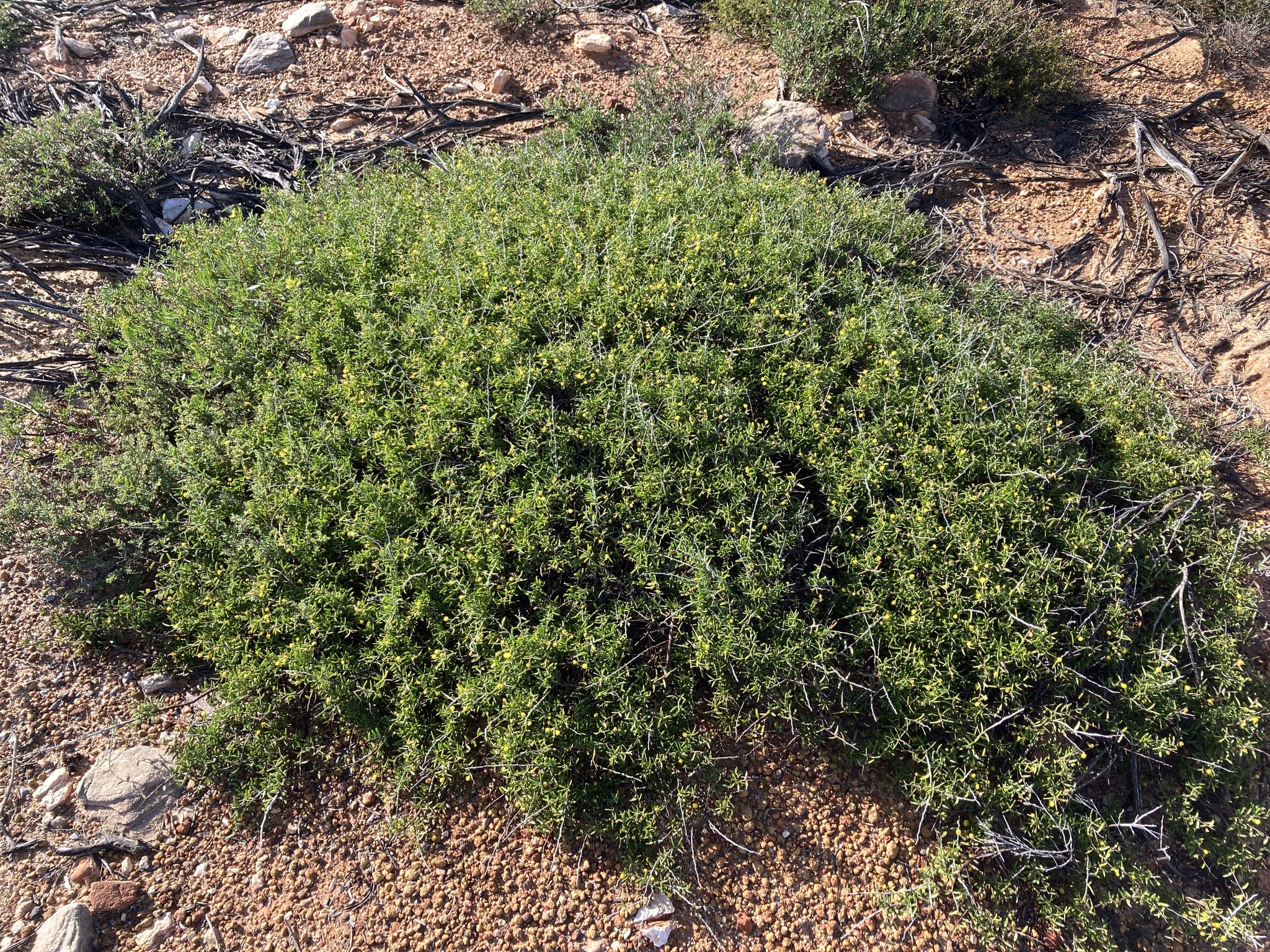
Habit near the Z Bend, Kalbarri National Park

Acacia andrewsii is a species of flowering plant in the family Fabaceae and is endemic to the south-west of Western Australia. It is an intricately branched shrub with narrowly oblong to lance-shaped, sometimes linear phyllodes, spherical heads of 20 to 30 golden-yellow flowers, and leathery pods up to 65 mm (2.6 in) long.

== Description ==
Acacia andrewsii is a spreading, intricately branched shrub that typically grows up to 2 m (6 ft 7 in) high, its branchlets more or less glabrous. Its phyllodes are narrowly oblong to lance-shaped or sometimes linear, usually 7–22 mm (0.28–0.87 in) long and 1–2 mm (0.039–0.079 in) wide and more or less sessile. The phyllodes are sharply pointed and usually green and glabrous with a prominent mid-vein. There are spiny stipules 1.0–1.5 mm (0.039–0.059 in) long at the base of the phyllodes. The flowers are borne in a spherical head in axils on a peduncle 5–16 mm (0.20–0.63 in) long, each head with 20 to 30 golden-yellow flowers. Flowering occurs from about June to October, and the fruit is a thickly leathery to more or less woody pod up to 65 mm (2.6 in) long and 4–5 mm (0.16–0.20 in) wide. The seeds are oblong to elliptic, 3.5–5 mm (0.14–0.20 in) long with a cone-shaped aril.

== Taxonomy ==
Acacia andrewsii was first formally described in 1904 by the botanist William Vincent Fitzgerald in the Journal of the West Australian Natural History Society from specimens collected in 1903. The specific epithet (andrewsii) honours Cecil Rollo Payton Andrews who bought the species to the attention of Fitzgerald.

== Distribution ==
This species of Acacia often grows in low lateritic or limestone hills and granite outcrops in a variety of soil types in the Avon Wheatbelt, Coolgardie, Geraldton Sandplains, Mallee, Murchison and Yalgoo bioregions of south-western Western Australia.

== See also ==
- List of Acacia species
