= William Vincent Fitzgerald =

Australian botanist (1867–1929)

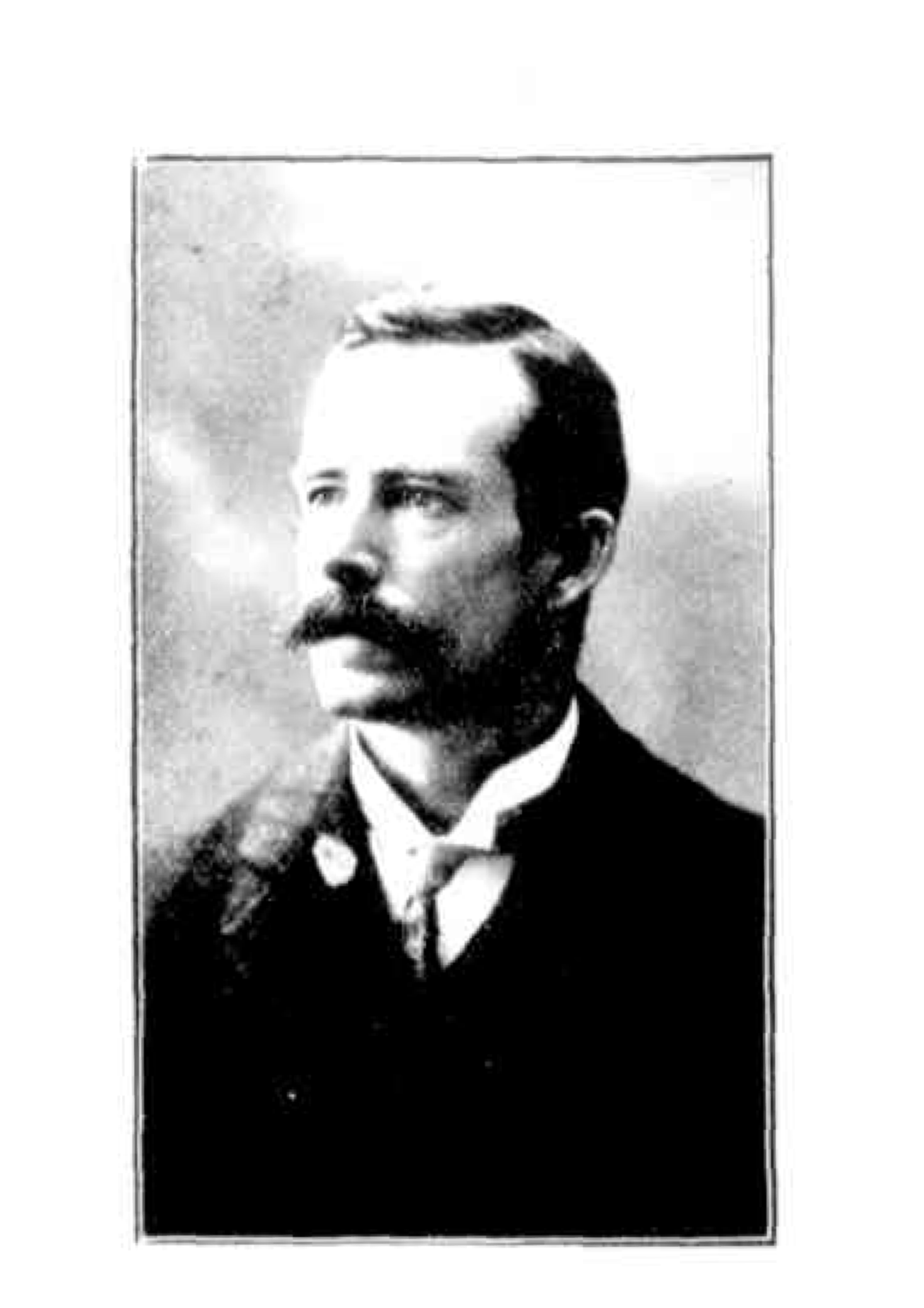
- William Vincent Fitzgerald
- Born: 21 July 1867; Mangana, near Ben Lomond (Tasmania), Australia
- Died: 6 August 1929 (aged 62); New Guinea
- Citizenship: Australia
- Scientific career
- Fields: botany
- Author abbrev. (botany): W.Fitzg.

William Vincent Fitzgerald (21 July 1867 – 6 August 1929) was an Australian botanist. He described five genera and about 210 species of plants from Western Australia, including 33 Acacia and several Eucalyptus species. He also collected for other botanists such as Ferdinand von Mueller and Joseph Maiden, and was known through his work on orchids. Eucalyptus fitzgeraldii was named for him by William Blakely.

Fitzgerald was born on the goldfields in north-eastern Tasmania and at the age of 16 was training for a career in mining, but by the time he was in his early 20s he was corresponding with, and sending plant specimens to Mueller. In 1903 he was a member of Western Australian Royal Commission on Forests, and the following year chairman of the Forests Advisory Board of Western Australia. In that year he described 23 Acacia species, mostly from the south-west of Western Australia, in the first edition of Journal of the West Australian Natural History Society (which later became the Journal of the Royal Society of Western Australia).

In 1905 he was appointed to the Department of Lands and Surveys as naturalist to the trigonometrical survey expedition to the Kimberley region and in the following year he was sent by the Minister of Lands to survey the potential for arable lands in the Kimberley. In 1912 he described in Journal of Botany six new south-west Western Australian species of Acacia discovered on these expeditions and three more in 1917.

The species named by him include Acacia acuaria, Acacia andrewsii, Acacia cliftoniana, Melaleuca argentea, Eucalyptus accedens and Eucalyptus argillacea.

He died near the Daru River whilst exploring the Bismarck Range in the central highlands of Papua New Guinea.
