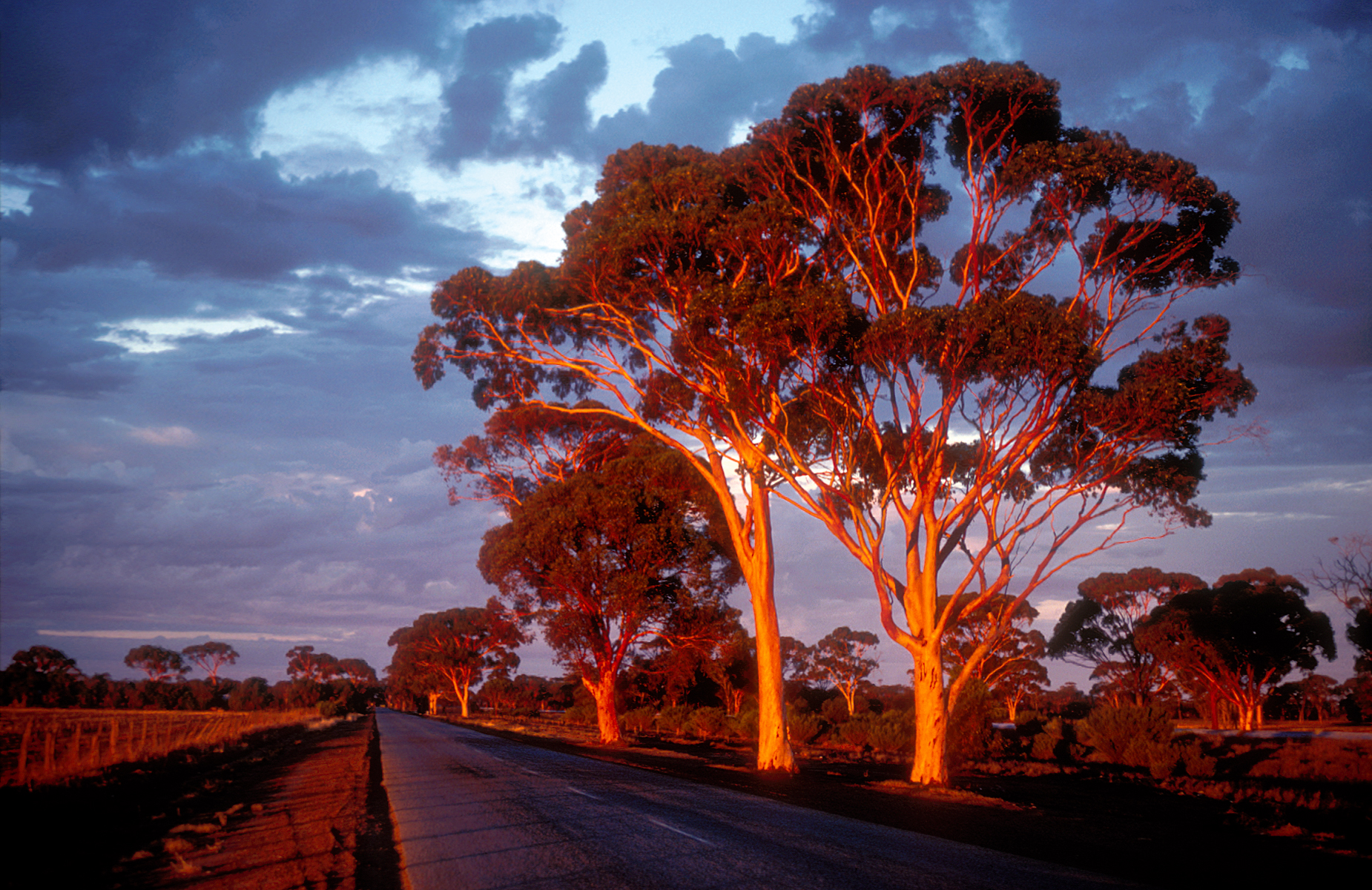
- Salmon Gums at sunset near Bruce Rock W.A.

Conservation status
- Vulnerable (IUCN 3.1)

Scientific classification
- Kingdom: Plantae
- Clade: Tracheophytes
- Clade: Angiosperms
- Clade: Eudicots
- Clade: Rosids
- Order: Myrtales
- Family: Myrtaceae
- Genus: Eucalyptus
- Species: E. salmonophloia

Binomial name
- Eucalyptus salmonophloia F.Muell.
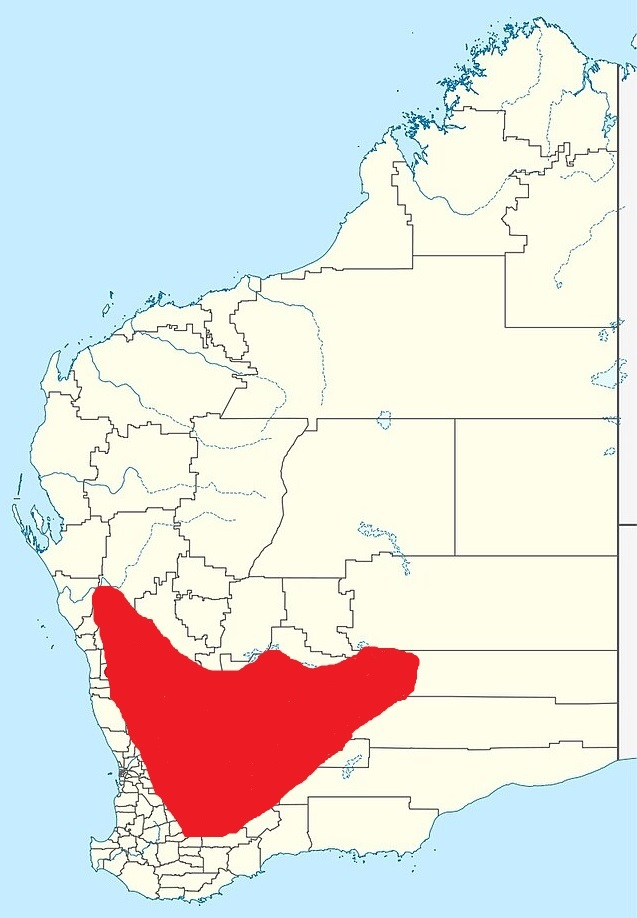
- Approximate native range of E. salmonophloia

= Eucalyptus salmonophloia =

Salmon gum

Species of eucalyptus

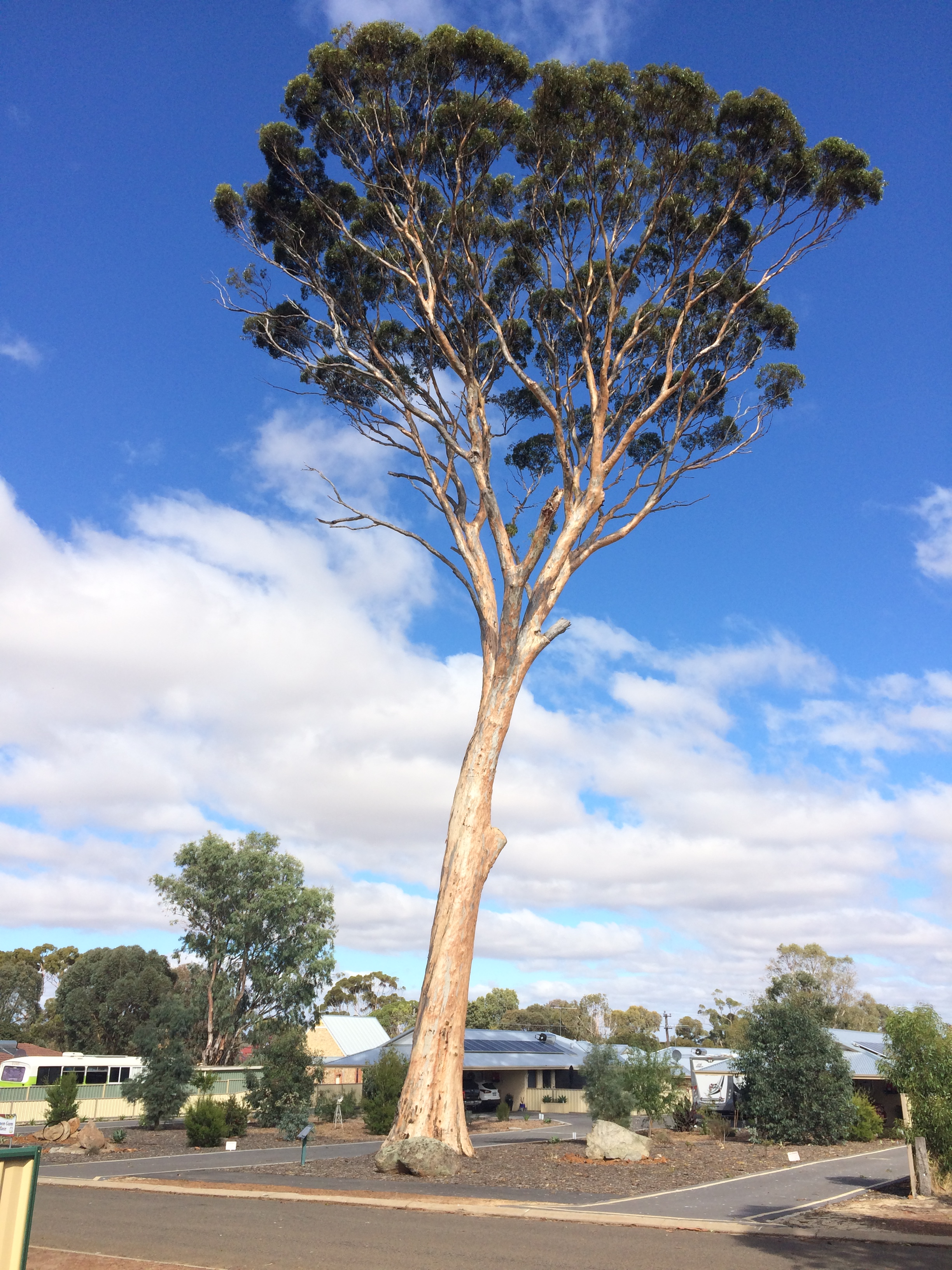
Salmon gum at Woodanilling

Eucalyptus salmonophloia, commonly known as salmon gum, wurak or weerluk or woonert or marrlinja. is a species of small to medium-sized tree that is endemic to Western Australia. It has smooth bark, narrow lance-shaped to curved adult leaves, flower buds in groups of between nine and thirteen, creamy white flowers and hemispherical fruit.

The species was first described by the botanist Ferdinand von Mueller in 1878 in his book Fragmenta Phytographiae Australiae using samples collected by Ernest Giles from near Victoria Springs, located approximately 200 km (120 mi) east of Kalgoorlie in the Great Victoria Desert.

The range of the tree extends through the Murchison, Mallee, Esperance Plains and Coolgardie regions as far east as the Great Victoria Desert. In western areas there are only remnant populations, extending from the York and Northam areas south to around Jerramungup, mostly as a result of agricultural practices. Eastern occurrences are far less disturbed and extend as far as Cundeelee to the north, around the Mt Gibson area, and to around Salmon Gums in the south.

E. salmonophloia is listed as not threatened under Western Australia's Wildlife Conservation Act 1950 according to the Department of Parks and Wildlife. It is recognised as being Vulnerable by the International Union for Conservation of Nature (IUCN) as of 2019, as a result of its severely fragmented population.

== Description ==
Eucalyptus salmonophloia is a tree that typically grows to a height of 4 to 30 m (13 to 98 ft) and a width of 8 to 10 m (26 to 33 ft) and does not form a lignotuber. The tree is fairly shallow rooting with roots spreading radially over quite a distance from the base of the tree, although the roots are deep enough to make the tree drought resistant. Taller trees can have trunks that are up to 12 m (39 ft) in length. Epicormic buds can be produced further up the stem allowing the tree to resprout after fire. It is an erect tree in form and has an umbrella shaped canopy. The crown of the tree can spread as wide as 30 m (98 ft) and provide shade over a wide area. It has smooth pale grey-silver bark that is quite thick and friable and which is shed in plates or flakes to reveal salmon-coloured new bark. The grey-silver coloured bark is usually found in winter and spring while the copper coloured bark is more prevalent in autumn and summer. The branchlets have no oil glands present in the pith. Seedlings and coppice growth have stems that are circular in cross-section.

Young plants have dull grey-green to green, egg-shaped to broadly lance-shaped leaves that are 70–90 mm (2.8–3.5 in) long and 12–30 mm (0.47–1.18 in) wide and petiolate. The leaves on younger plants are arranged in opposite pairs for about the first ten nodes, then have an alternate arrangement for the remainder. Adult leaves are arranged alternately, the same shade of glossy green on both sides. They are narrow lance-shaped to curved, 60–120 mm (2.4–4.7 in) long and 6–17 mm (0.24–0.67 in) wide, tapering to a leaf stalk that is 7–20 mm (0.28–0.79 in) in length. and are quite fragrant. The leaves have dense reticulation with faint lateral veins found at an angle of 30°–40° to the midrib. The intramarginal vein is found about 1 mm (0.039 in) from the edge of the leaf margin. The oil glands in the leaves at situated at the intersections of the veinlets. The darker green and burnished appearance of the leaves is particular to this species in the area it is found. The leaves transpire through the stomata continuously through the year even in times of drought.

The tree flowers in summer between November or December and March but has also been seen flowering in May and between August and October. Flowering occurs about every three years. The inflorescences have creamy white coloured flowers. The axillary flower buds are arranged in leaf axils in groups of between nine and thirteen on an unbranched peduncle 4–13 mm (0.16–0.51 in) long, the individual buds on pedicels 2–4 mm (0.079–0.157 in) long. Mature buds are oval to spherical, 4–7 mm (0.16–0.28 in) long and 3–4 mm (0.12–0.16 in) wide. The cap of the flower bud is formed by the fusion of the sepals, and opens when mature to expose the reproductive organs. The cap is conical to rounded and is scarred. The stamens are bent irregularly and have spherical to cubic shaped anthers that are attached at the base that spilt along slits. The blunt stigma is atop a long and straight style. At the base of the stigma are three chambers each containing four rows of ovules arranged vertically.

The fruit is a woody, hemispherical capsule 3–5 mm (0.12–0.20 in) long and 4–5 mm (0.16–0.20 in) wide and has a hemispherical or obconical hypanthium that is 2 to 3 mm (0.079 to 0.118 in) in length and has a width of 3 to 4 mm (0.12 to 0.16 in) with three valves protruding but fragile. The capsules usually remain in place until the following summer or longer, each capsule containing about 600 viable seeds per gram. The brown coloured seeds have a flattened egg-shape with smooth surface and a length of 0.8 to 2 mm (0.031 to 0.079 in). Trees are able to retain seed bearing fruits for up to six years. The seeds can withstand cycles of wetting and drying; however, wet seeds left at low temperatures can germinate but do not often survive. Salmon gums belong to a group of eucalypts that require a catastrophic event to cause large numbers of seeds to fall.

The species has a haploid chromosome number of 12.

Eucalyptus salmonophloia looks much like E. salicola, both having a similar habit and salmon-coloured bark; however, E. salmonophloia is differentiated by its egg-shaped to lance-shaped juvenile leaves and spherical buds. Eucalyptus salicola is also able to tolerate a saline habitat.

== Taxonomy and naming ==
Eucalyptus salmonophloia was first formally described by the botanist Ferdinand von Mueller in 1878 in his book Fragmenta Phytographiae Australiae, based on samples collected by Ernest Giles from near Victoria Springs. The specific epithet refers to the salmon-coloured bark.

The Noongar peoples know the tree as wurak or weerluk or woonert. The Ngadju peoples further east know the tree as marrlinja.

Two syntypes and one isotype are held at Royal Botanic Gardens, Kew. The syntypes were collected by James Drummond. The notes on the samples indicated the sample had been at the Herbarium Hookerianum in 1867 and was initially identified as Eucalyptus leptopoda. The isotype was collected by C. Giles in 1884 from the upper reaches of the Swan River.

Three other syntypes are held at the National Herbarium of Victoria, all collected by Ferdinand von Mueller. One was collected in 1877 from the upper reaches of the Swan River, another in 1887 near York and the third in the same year but beyond York.

The tree is a part of the subgenus Symphyomyrtus and the Bisectae section and belongs to the Destitutae subsection. Member of this subsection have buds with two opercula and have no oil glands in the pith of the branchlets. E. salmonophloia has no close relatives within the Destitutae subsection. It is the single species belonging to the series Salmonophloiae. It has superficial similarities to the series Subulatae but the fruit of the salmon gum has wide valves over the shallow ovary distinguishing it from the species in that series which all have deeply sunk ovaries.

== Distribution and habitat ==
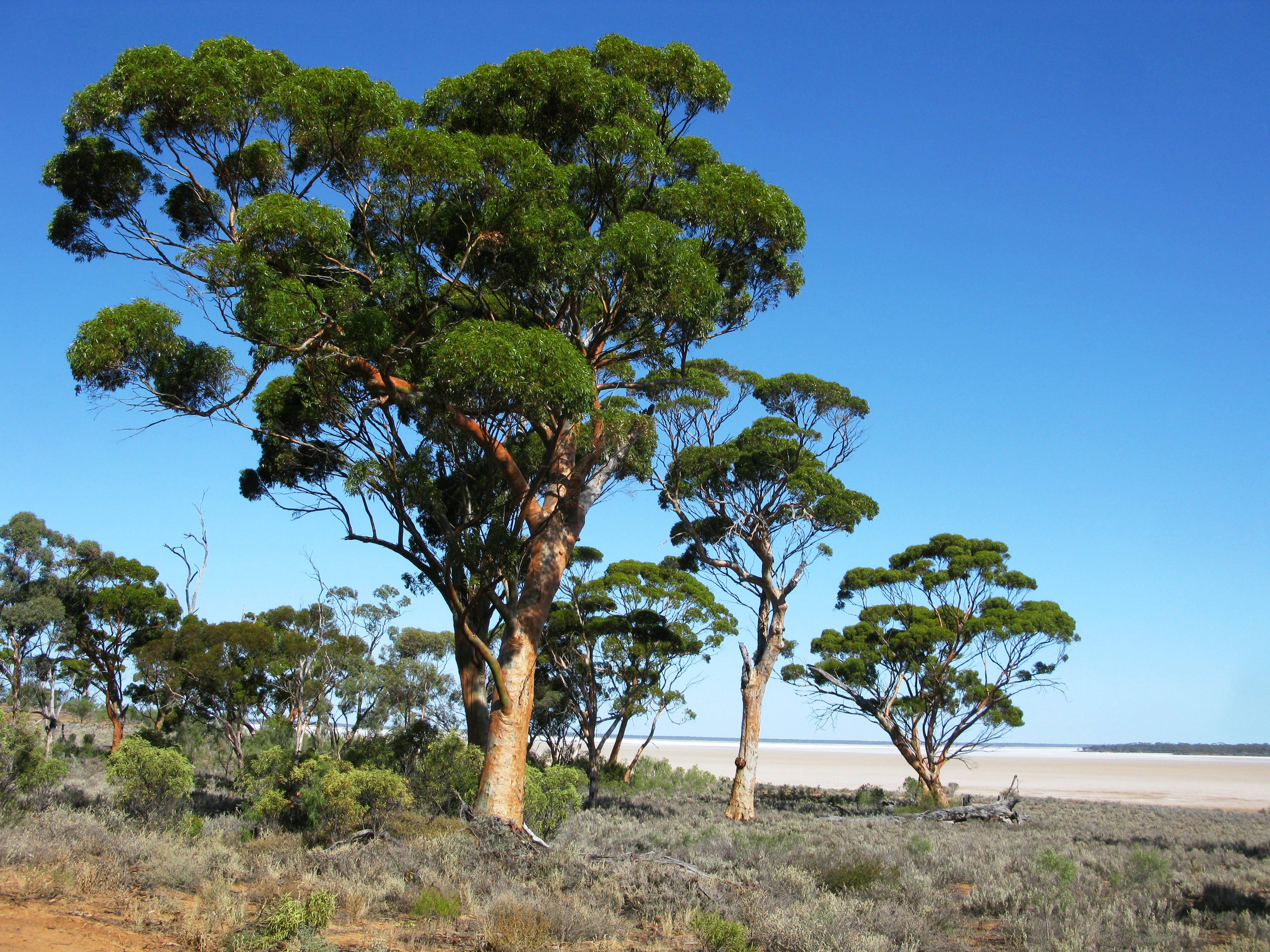
Salmon gums around Lake Hope near Norseman

Found in large woodland communities, E. salmonophloia is found in the southern Wheatbelt and Goldfields-Esperance region of Western Australia. It exists in the following IBRA regions: from the Geraldton Sandplains in the northwest extending south in the Avon Wheatbelt and into the Jarrah Forest region. The range extends through the Murchison, Mallee, Esperance Plains and Coolgardie regions as far east as the Great Victoria Desert. In western areas there are only remnant populations, extending from the York and Northam areas south to around Jerramungup, mostly as a result of agricultural practices. Eastern occurrences are far less disturbed and extend as far as Cundeelee to the north around the Mt Gibson area and to around Salmon Gums to the south. The tree usually dominates these communities, forming a sparse upper canopy. Found growing in broad valleys, plains and low hills in areas that receive as little as 250 millimetres (10 in) of rain per year, it grows in alkaline loamy soils, red clay loam, red clay and red sandy soils, often with gravel. It is found in granite soils in western areas and calcerous soils in eastern areas.

E. salmonophloia is found growing in the Mediterranean climate of the south west of Western Australia and extending east into a semi arid climate area. It is found across a rainfall gradient of 500 mm (20 in) per annum in the west near York to around 200 mm (7.9 in) to the north of Zanthus.

It is able to grow in moderately saline soils and can tolerate salinity levels of <1,0000 mS/m.

The tree can be found in pure stands or mixed with other species of eucalypt, especially Eucalyptus salubris, Eucalyptus transcontinentalis and Eucalyptus longicornis or as remnants as a part of mallee or lower woodland communities. Associated species include Eucalyptus salubris, Eucalyptus longicornis, Eucalyptus wandoo and Eucalyptus loxophleba subsp. loxophleba in the overstorey and a huge variety of species in the understorey including Acacia erinacea, Templetonia sulcata, Melaleuca acuminata, Santalum acuminatum, Sclerolaena diacantha, Rhagodia drummondii, Austrostipa trichophylla and Calandrinia calyptrata.

The tree has been introduced to Morocco and Pakistan.

== Ecology ==
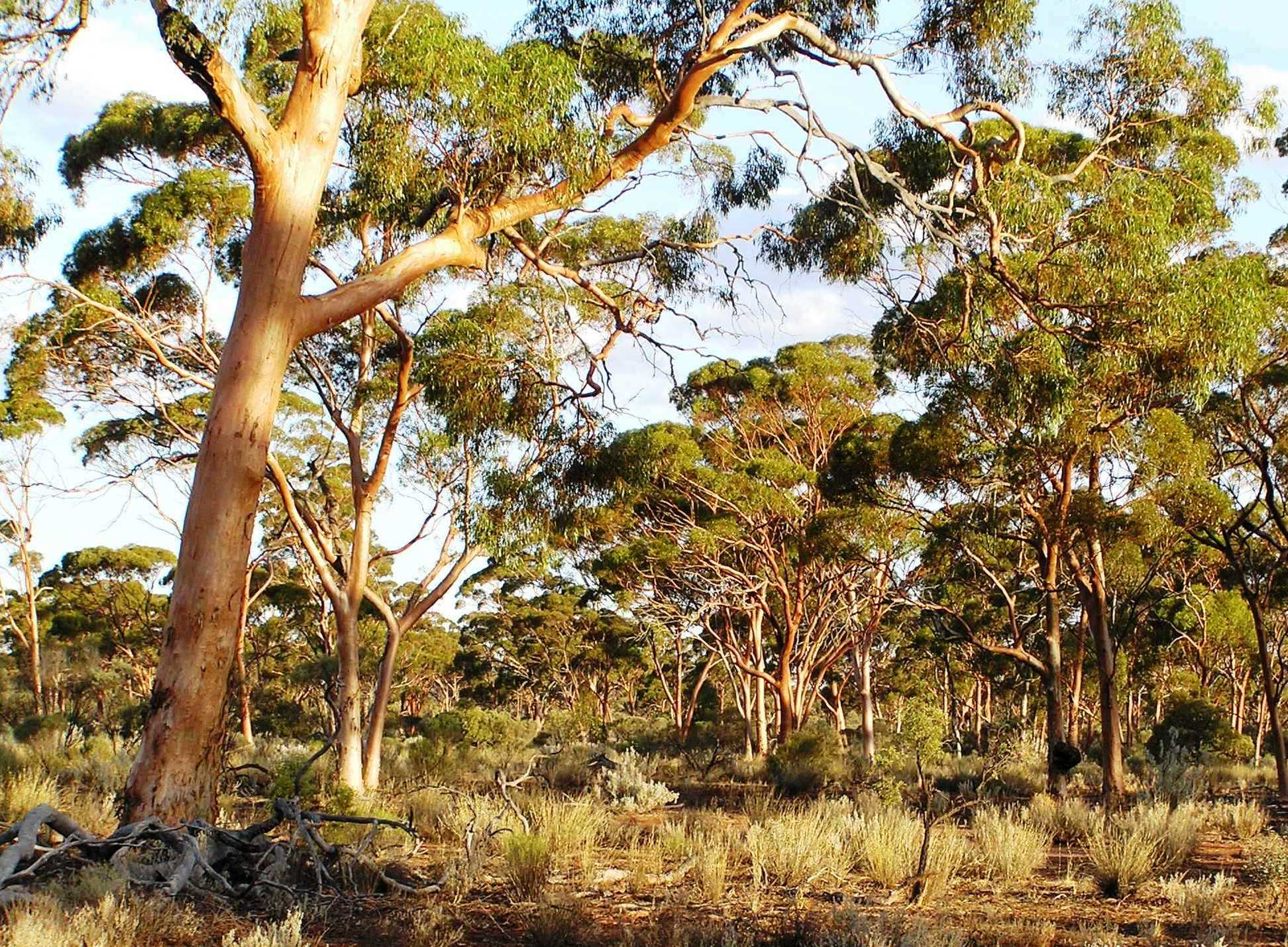
Salmon gum woodland

Eucalyptus salmonophloia is listed as not threatened under Western Australia's Wildlife Conservation Act 1950 according to the Department of Parks and Wildlife. It is recognised as being Vulnerable by the International Union for Conservation of Nature (IUCN) as of 2019, as a result of its severely fragmented population. The Eucalypt woodlands of the Western Australia wheatbelt region, of which the salmon gum is considered to be a key plant species, were listed as critically endangered in December 2015 according to the Environment Protection and Biodiversity Conservation Act 1999.

The range of the tree was once estimated to be over 287,718 km^{2} (111,089 sq mi) but is now estimated to be 182,713 km^{2} (70,546 sq mi); the decline in habitat area has been attributed to the clearing of land for agricultural purposes.

This species of Eucalypt is known to have a life span of over 150 years and has a moderate growth rate. The Ngadju peoples who inhabited the Great Western Woodland rarely burned old growth forests of E. salmonophloia, knowing that it would take centuries for the area to completely recover.

Within the Great Western Woodlands two types of Salmon Gum woodlands have been identified:

- Communities of Eucalyptus salmonophloia and Eremophila ionantha along with a mixture of species from other families. These are located more in the central and southern areas of the woodland. Often found on mid-slope areas with sandy soils with more consistent rainfall and cooler temperatures.
- Communities of Eucalyptus salmonophloia and Maireana sedifolia found in more arid areas in the north of the woodlands and composed of other species that are mostly chenopods.

Other types of salmon gum communities include:

- Communities of Eucalyptus salmonophloia and Melaleuca pauperiflora subsp. fastigiata which are found both in the Wheatbelt and to the east.
- Communities of Eucalyptus salmonophloia and Atriplex semibaccata situated in northwestern areas of the Wheatbelt.
- Communities of Eucalyptus salmonophloia and Templetonia sulcata found in southwestern parts of the Wheatbelt where the annual rainfall is higher.

Hollows in live or dead trees with a diameter at breast height of over 300 mm (12 in) are a known nesting area for six species of Black cockatoos, two of which are endangered species, including Carnaby's black cockatoo. The birds use these sites, when situated in woodlands or forests, as a breeding habitat. Carnaby's black cockatoos are also known to use the flowers and seeds as a food source.

Hollow logs of these trees found on the ground are used as habitat by echidnas through the Wheatbelt region.

=== Destructors ===
E. salmonophloia acts as a host plant for the parasitic species of mistletoe Amyema miquelii. Mistletoe is more likely to occur in larger fragments of salmon gum woodland than in smaller fragments. Areas open to grazing have been found to contain no mistletoe so it is thought that grazing modifies the habitat to make it unsuitable for the mistletoe or that frugivorous birds which are able to disperse mistletoe seeds are not present as the shrubby understory has been removed.

The tree is known to be resistant to dieback caused by the Phytophthora cinnamomi fungus.

If the fruit of the plant drops to the ground once disturbed by birds or insects it is prone to destruction or predation by ants.

=== Pollinators ===
Salmon gum is pollinated by a variety of insects which are rewarded with pollen and nectar; these insects include European honeybees, native bees, hoverflies, wasps, butterflies, moths, beetles and flies.

Other observed pollinators include two species of honeyeater, purple-crowned lorikeets (Glossopsitta porphyrocephala) and a Euryglossine bee. The number of bird pollinators is thought to be an under estimate.

=== Pollination ===
Large and unfragmented populations of E. salmonophloia produced approximately the same number of seeds per capsule as fragmented smaller populations. Seed weight, seed germination, survival of seedlings and vigour of seedlings in the first year are found to be independent of population fragmentation or size. Data collected suggest that increased fragmentation and smaller population size can reduce pollen quality and/or quantity, so that seed production is also reduced but no fitness effects were recorded on seed maturation. It is thought that the resilience of seed maturation fitness in smaller and fragmented populations results from wide outcrossing from long-distance pollen dispersal by birds between the populations or more efficient zygotic selection in the fruits so that only more highly outbred seeds are able to mature.

Given these trees are long lived and large they are thought to be likely to be predominantly outcrossing and have a mixed mating system.

== Uses ==
The timber produced by E. salmonophloia is noted for its durability and is used to make railway sleepers and mining shaft supports. Historically, the mining industry cut down the tree to use for construction and as a fuel source, and along with two acacia species it is credited with allowing the development of the goldfields. It had advantages as a fuel in that it could be burned immediately in boilers, unlike other hardwoods that had to be dried for months before burning. The ash was also thought to contain more potash than other woods. In 1922 Western Australia's forest department promoted the very dense timber as the second strongest in Australia. It is still commonly used for wood fires and makes excellent firewood. It is an excellent species for rehabilitation areas and for areas requiring soil stabilization as it is drought tolerant, frost resistant, fast growing and able to grow in poor soils. The heartwood of the tree is fine-textured and dense with a reddish to dark red-brown colour and has considerable potential for use in high value furniture, flooring, panelling, craftwood and in musical instruments such as flute headpoints. Craftsmen rate the wood as good for turning, machinability, boring, screwholding, stability, sanding, gluing and finishing. Honey flow for apiculture is reported from December to March. The honey produced is clear and fine and the naturalised bees can use hollow tree trunks as a site for a hive.

The density of green wood is about 1160 kg/m^{3} with an air-dried density about 1040 kg/m^{3}.

As for many species of Eucalyptus, the leaves are a good source of essential oils with E. salmonophloia able to yield up to 3.6% oil from its foliage which can contain up to 77% cineole.

== Gallery ==
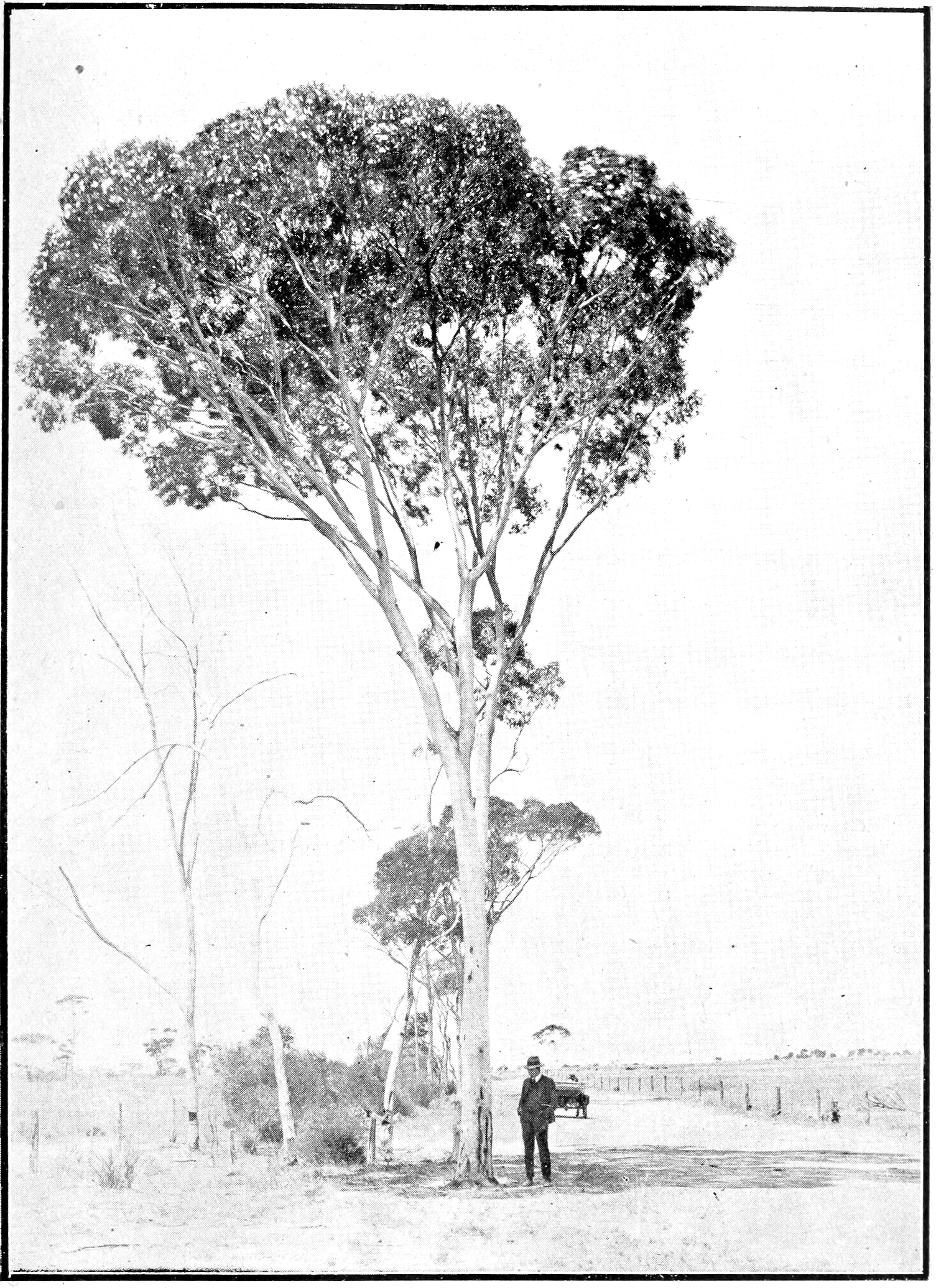
Large specimen with man at right on roadside, circa 1920

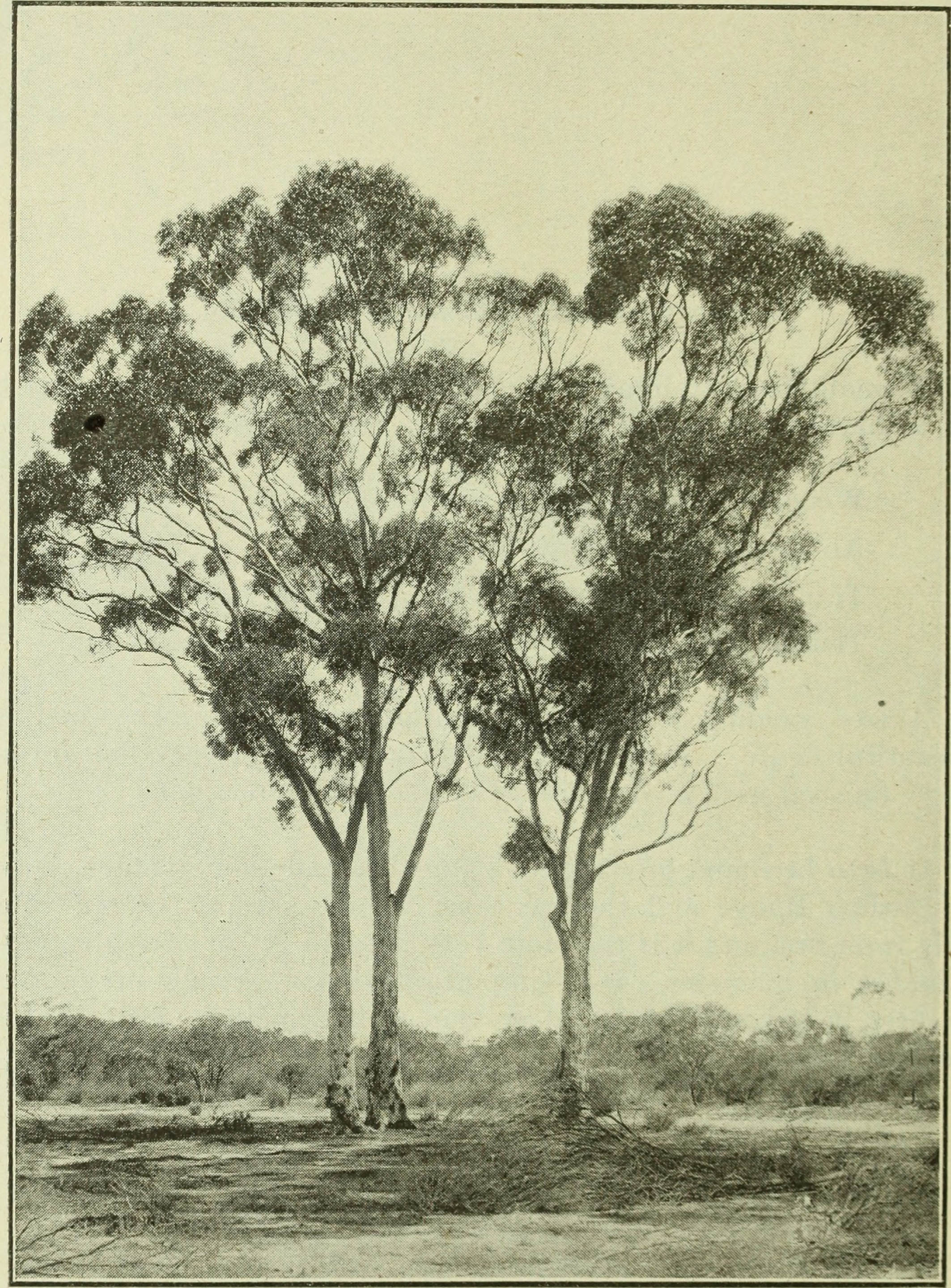
Dual trees displaying habit, c. 1920

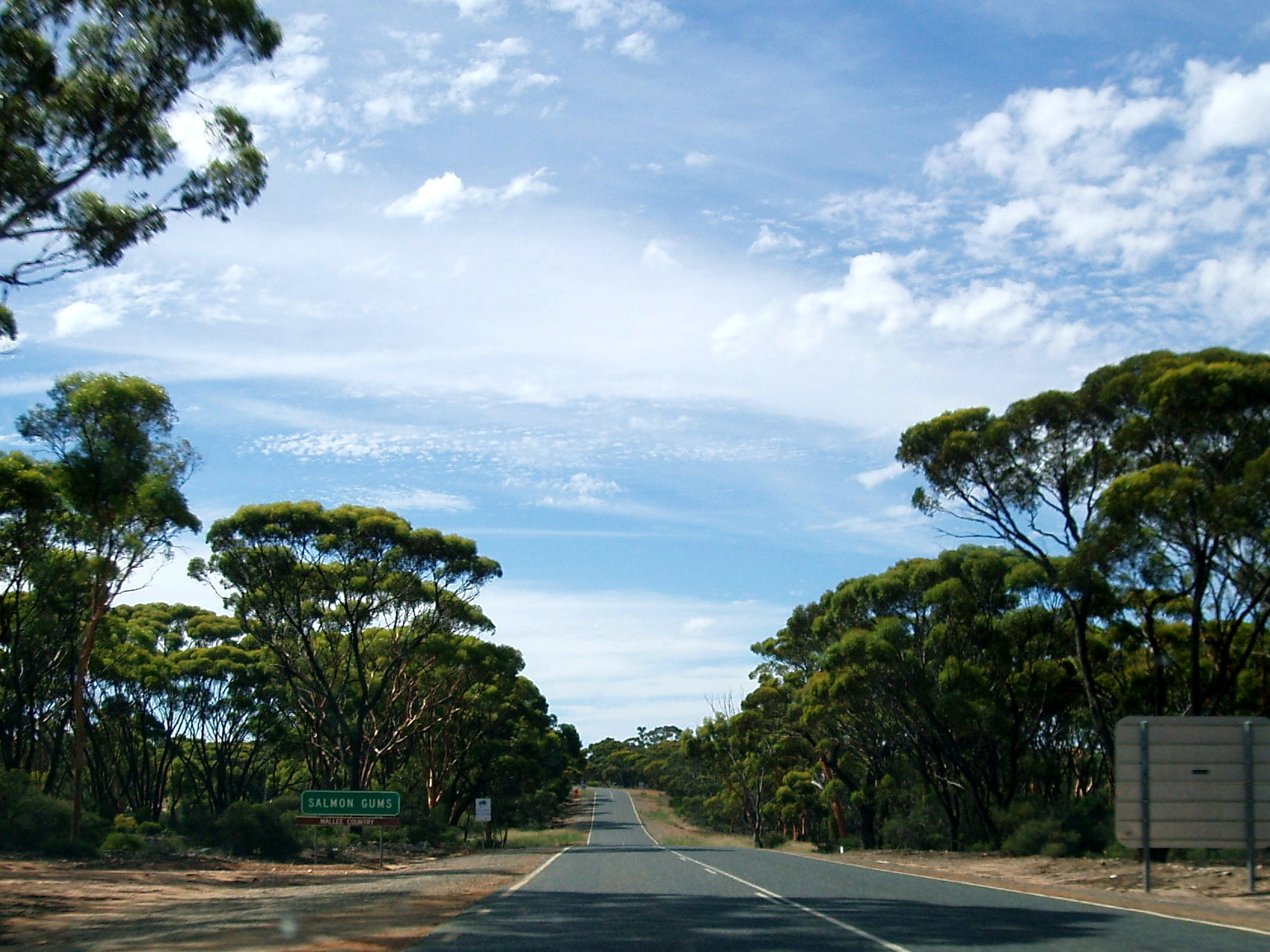
Eucalyptus salmonophloia in Australia
