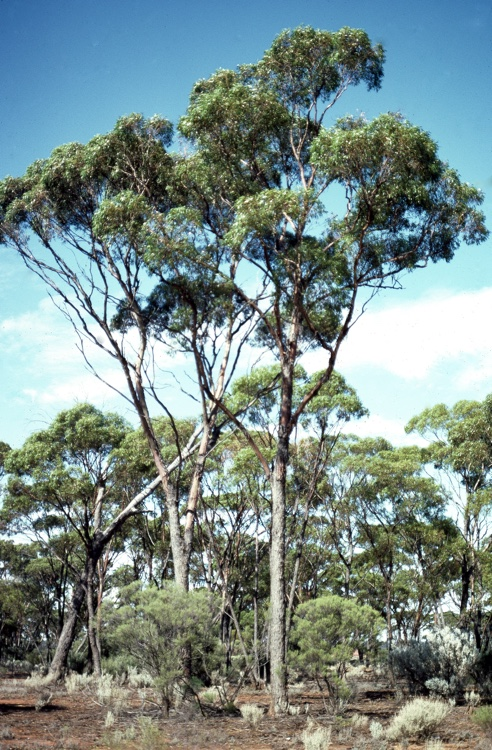
- Eucalyptus longicornis near Southern Cross

Conservation status
- Endangered (IUCN 3.1)

Scientific classification
- Kingdom: Plantae
- Clade: Tracheophytes
- Clade: Angiosperms
- Clade: Eudicots
- Clade: Rosids
- Order: Myrtales
- Family: Myrtaceae
- Genus: Eucalyptus
- Species: E. longicornis

Binomial name
- Eucalyptus longicornis (F.Muell.) F.Muell. ex Maiden

Synonyms
- Eucalyptus longicornis (F.Muell.) F.Muell. ex Maiden subsp. longicornis; Eucalyptus oleosa var. longicornis F.Muell.

= Eucalyptus longicornis =

Red morrel

Species of eucalyptus

Eucalyptus longicornis, commonly known as red morrel, morryl, poot or pu, is a species of large tree that is endemic to the south-west of Western Australia. It has rough, fibrous, fissured bark on the trunk, smooth greyish bark above, flower buds in groups of seven or more, white flowers and shortened spherical fruit.

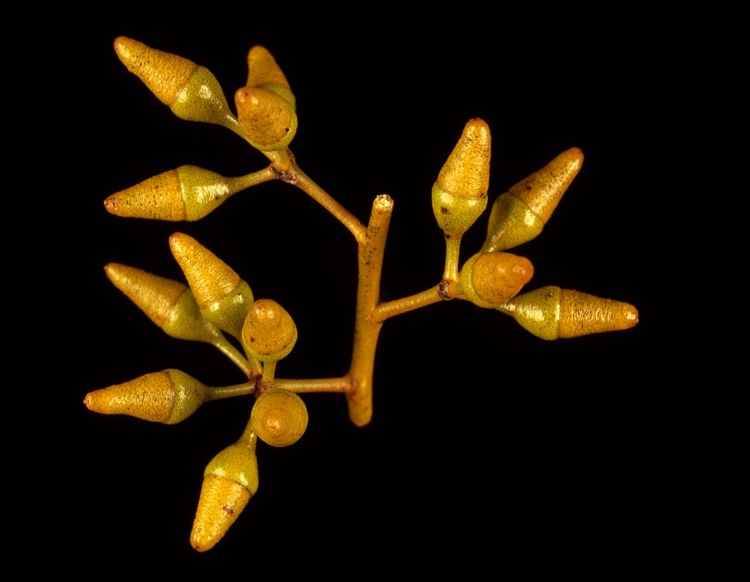
Flower buds

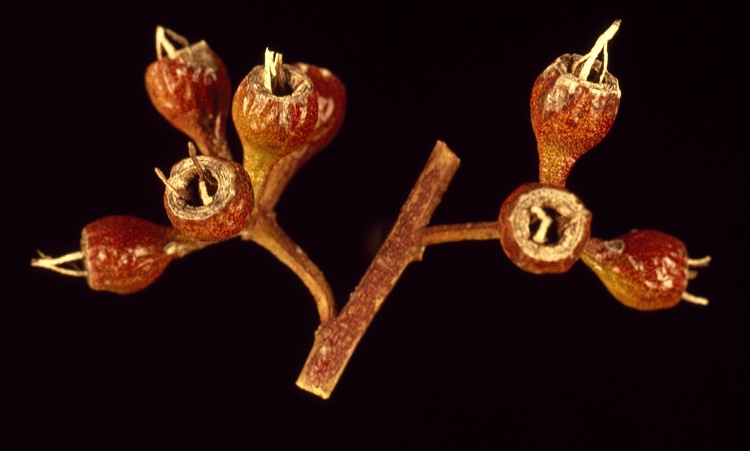
Fruit

== Description ==
Eucalyptus longicornis is a tree that typically that grows to a height of 2 to 24 metres (7 to 79 ft) and can reach as high as 30 m (98 ft). It has rough, grey brown, fibrous, often fissured bark on the trunk, smooth white to greyish bark above. Young plants and coppice regrowth have stems that are glaucous, more or less square in cross-section, and sessile, lance-shaped to egg-shaped leaves that are 20–85 mm (0.79–3.35 in) long and 9–26 mm (0.35–1.02 in) wide. Adult leaves are arranged alternately, thick, the same shade of glossy green on both sides, linear to narrow lance-shaped, 60–130 mm (2.4–5.1 in) long and 6–13 mm (0.24–0.51 in) wide, tapering to a petiole 10–15 mm (0.39–0.59 in) long. The flower buds are arranged in groups of between seven and thirteen in leaf axils on an unbranched peduncle 6–13 mm (0.24–0.51 in) long, the individual buds on pedicels 4–9 mm (0.16–0.35 in) long. Mature buds are oval, 9–15 mm (0.35–0.59 in) long and 3–6 mm (0.12–0.24 in) wide with a pointed operculum 7–10 mm (0.28–0.39 in) long. Flowering occurs between December and February and the flowers are white. The fruit is a woody shortened spherical capsule 6–8 mm (0.24–0.31 in) long and wide with the valves protruding well above the rim of the fruit. The capsules contain over 200 seeds per gram and persist on the tree until at least the following year, often longer.

== Taxonomy and naming ==
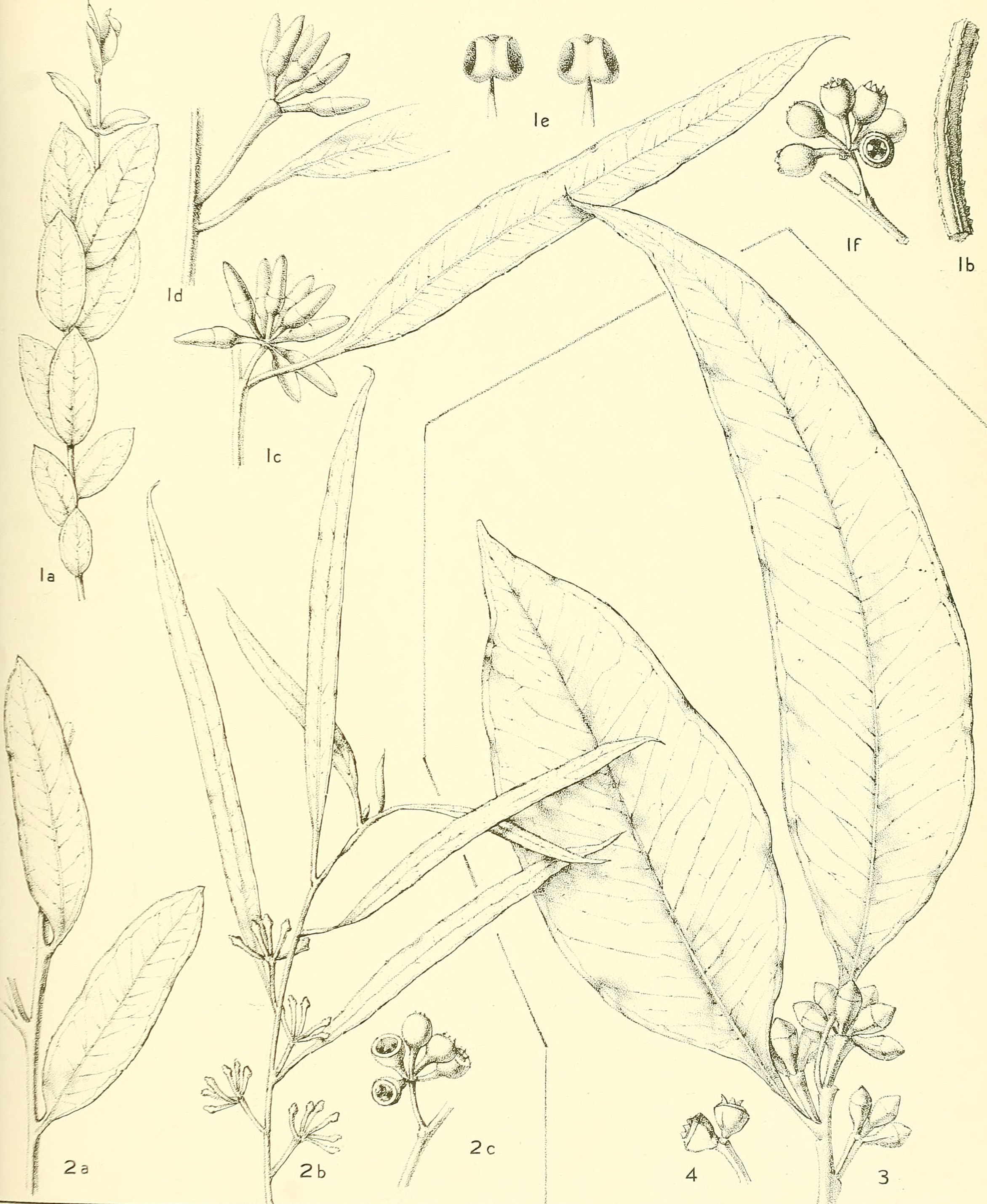
Sketch of E. longicornis from A critical revision of the genus Eucalyptus

This species was first formally described in 1878 by Ferdinand von Mueller who gave it the name Eucalyptus oleosa var. longicornis and published the description in Fragmenta Phytographiae Australiae. In 1919 Joseph Maiden noted that Mueller had referred to the species as Eucalyptus longicornis, including in his book Eucalyptographia without having published a description of that species. Maiden published the new name in Journal and Proceedings of the Royal Society of New South Wales, acknowledging Mueller's first use of it.

The Noongar peoples know the tree as morryl, poot or put.

The specific epithet (longicornis) is derived from the Latin words longus meaning "long" and cornu meaning "horn", referring to the shape of the flower buds.

== Distribution ==
The red morrel is distributed through the Wheatbelt and southern Goldfields-Esperance regions of Western Australia. It is found growing in loamy soils, often over limestone or clay loam on flats. The dark red loams, that are rich in minerals and often slightly saline, associated with the decomposition of the fine-grained dolerite gneiss dykes and outcropping units of the Yilgarn Block best suit the tree.

== Ecology ==
The species is usually found in woodland communities where it is an overstorey tree, in an unmixed stand or with E. salmonophloia and either E. melanoxylon, E. wandoo, E. loxophleba, E. astringens or E. kondininensis. Associated species in the understorey include Sclerolaena diacantha, Lycium australe, Acacia merrallii, Melaleuca pauperiflora and Rhagodia drummondii.

== Conservation status ==
This eucalypt is classified as "not threatened" in Western Australia by the Western Australian Government Department of Parks and Wildlife.

== Uses ==
Eucalyptus longicornis is a tall tree with potential to be cultivated on highly alkaline, saline and clayey soils. It is marketed as an ornamental or windbreak species and is useful for apiculture. The wood was used historically in the mining industry as a source of timber and fuel. The fine-textured, reddish to dark red-brown wood has considerable potential for use in high value furniture and craftwood.

== See also ==
- List of Eucalyptus species
