= Eucalyptus salicola =

Salt gum

Conservation status
- Near Threatened (IUCN 3.1)

Scientific classification
- Kingdom: Plantae
- Clade: Tracheophytes
- Clade: Angiosperms
- Clade: Eudicots
- Clade: Rosids
- Order: Myrtales
- Family: Myrtaceae
- Genus: Eucalyptus
- Species: E. salicola

Binomial name
- Eucalyptus salicola Brooker

Species of eucalyptus

Eucalyptus salicola, commonly known as salt gum, salt lake salmon gum or salt salmon gum, is a species of small to medium-sized tree that is endemic to the southwest of Western Australia. It has smooth, powdery bark, linear to narrow lance-shaped adult leaves, flower buds in groups of seven, nine or eleven, creamy white flowers and cup-shaped to hemispherical fruit.

== Description ==
Eucalyptus salicola is a tree that typically grows to a height of 4–15 m (13–49 ft), sometimes to 25 m (82 ft) but lacks a lignotuber. It has smooth, powdery white to pale grey bark that is salmon pink when new. Young plants have glaucous, heart-shaped to round leaves that are 10–27 mm (0.39–1.06 in) long and 7–15 mm (0.28–0.59 in) wide. Adult leaves are the same shade of glossy green on both sides, linear to narrow lance-shaped, 35–105 mm (1.4–4.1 in) long and 4–12 mm (0.16–0.47 in) wide, tapering to a petiole 5–13 mm (0.20–0.51 in) long. The flower buds are arranged in leaf axils in groups of seven, nine or eleven on an unbranched peduncle 3–10 mm (0.12–0.39 in) long, the individual buds on pedicels 2–5 mm (0.079–0.197 in) long. Mature buds are oval to spindle-shaped, 5–9 mm (0.20–0.35 in) long and 2.5–4 mm (0.098–0.157 in) wide with a conical to beaked operculum about the same length as the floral cup. Flowering occurs between January and March and the flowers are creamy-white. The fruit is a woody, short cup-shaped to hemispherical capsule 2–5 mm (0.079–0.197 in) long and 3–4 mm (0.12–0.16 in) wide with the valves near rim level.

This species has a similar habit to and coloration to Eucalyptus salmonophloia.

== Taxonomy and naming ==
Eucalyptus salicola was first formally described by the botanist Ian Brooker in 1988 in the journal Nuytsia. The type specimen was collected by Brooker and Stephen Hopper in 1984 to the east of Kulja along the Mollerin North Road. The specific epithet (salicola) is from Latin words meaning "salt" and "dweller".

== Distribution and habitat ==
Salt gum is found around salt lakes and clay pans in the Wheatbelt and Goldfields-Esperance regions of Western Australia where it grows in red sandy clay-loam soils. The distribution is scattered but widespread extending from as far west as Newdegate to the Great Victoria Desert in the east.

It occurs in woodland communities with associated overstorey species including E. loxophleba, E. salubris, E. myriadena, E. annulata and E. brachycorys. Low trees include Callitris columellaris and Pittosporum angustifolium.

== Cultivation ==
The tree is commercially available and is use for land reclamation and firewood production. It is moderately slow growing but is salt tolerant and can also tolerate waterlogged soils.

== Use ==
The heartwood has a brown-red colour with a medium grain with a green density of about 1,215 kilograms per cubic metre (76 lb/cu ft). The wood is also used by craftsman with good screwholding and excellent for turning, machinability, sanding and finishing.

== See also ==
- List of Eucalyptus species
