= Eucalyptus protensa =

Scientific classification
- Kingdom: Plantae
- Clade: Tracheophytes
- Clade: Angiosperms
- Clade: Eudicots
- Clade: Rosids
- Order: Myrtales
- Family: Myrtaceae
- Genus: Eucalyptus
- Species: E. protensa

Binomial name
- Eucalyptus protensa L.A.S.Johnson & K.D.Hill

Species of eucalyptus

Eucalyptus protensa is a species of mallee that is endemic to the southwest of Western Australia. It has smooth, dark grey or brownish bark, narrow lance-shaped adult leaves, elongated flower buds in groups of seven, yellowish green flowers and hemispherical fruit.

== Description ==
Eucalyptus protensa is a mallee, sometimes a tree, that typically grows to a height of 4–10 m (13–33 ft) but does not form a lignotuber. It has smooth dark grey or brownish bark with an oily appearance. The adult leaves are the same shade of glossy dark green on both sides, narrow lance-shaped, 50–125 mm (2.0–4.9 in) long and 7–17 mm (0.28–0.67 in) wide tapering to a petiole 10–20 mm (0.39–0.79 in) long. The flower buds are arranged in leaf axils in groups of seven on an unbranched peduncle 7–13 mm (0.28–0.51 in) long, the individual buds on pedicels 3–7 mm (0.12–0.28 in) long. Mature buds are cylindrical, 29–40 mm (1.1–1.6 in) long and 6–9 mm (0.24–0.35 in) wide with a tapered, elongated operculum that is up to seven times as long as the floral cup. Flowering occurs from September to November and the flowers are yellowish green. The fruit is a woody, hemispherical to shortened spherical capsule 6–8 mm (0.24–0.31 in) long and 8–13 mm (0.31–0.51 in) wide with the valved protruding strongly.

== Taxonomy and naming ==
Eucalyptus protensa was first formally described in 1991 by Lawrie Johnson and Ken Hill from material collected 60 km (37 mi) east of Norseman in 1983. The specific epithet (protensa) is from the Latin protensus meaning "stretched out" or "extended", referring to the long operculum.

== Distribution and habitat ==
This eucalypt grows on undulating plains between Norseman and Balladonia in the Fraser Range.

== Conservation status ==
This mallee is classified as "not threatened" by the Western Australian Government Department of Parks and Wildlife,

== See also ==
- List of Eucalyptus species
