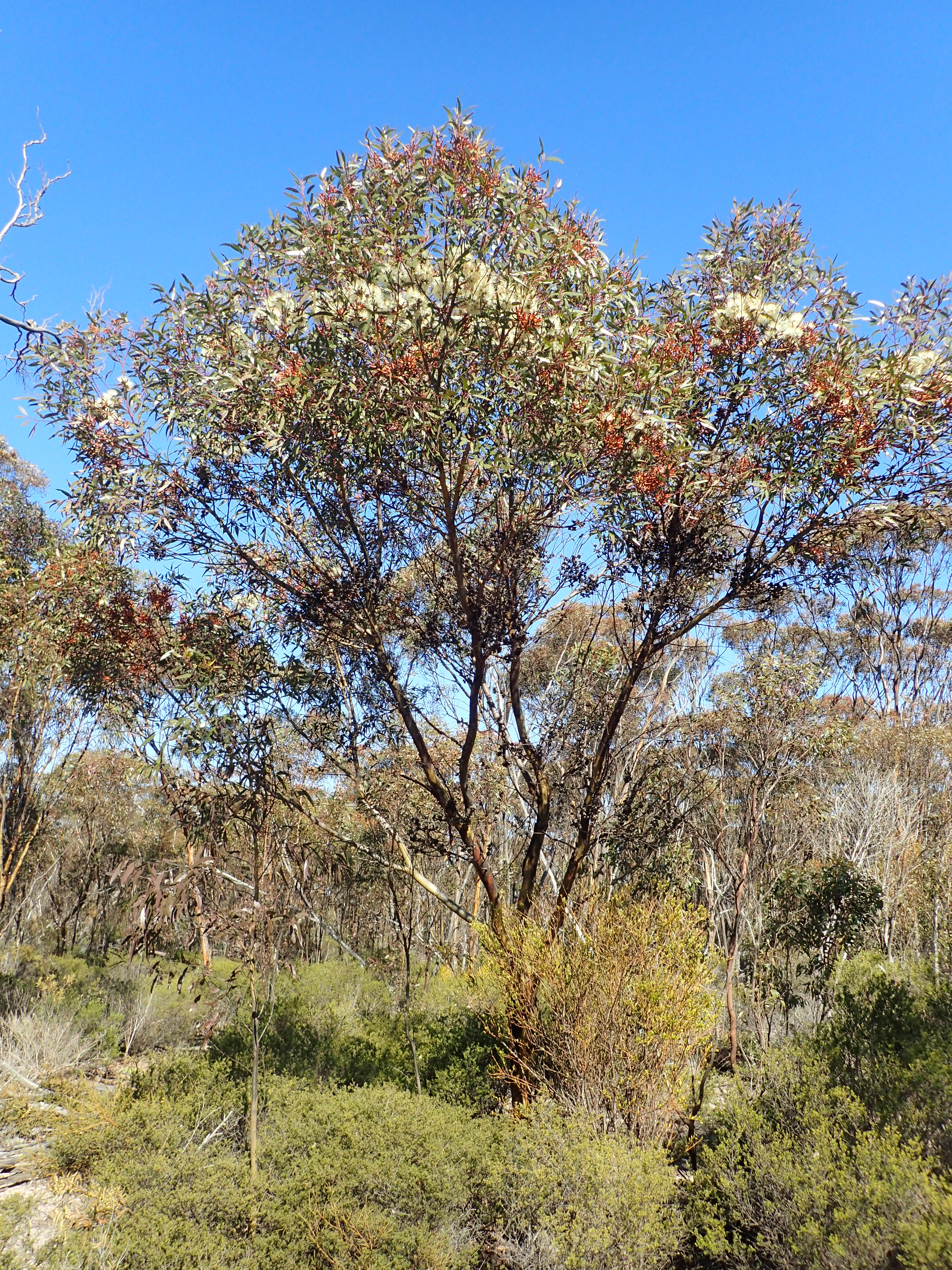
- Eucalyptus extensa near Ravensthorpe

Scientific classification
- Kingdom: Plantae
- Clade: Embryophytes
- Clade: Tracheophytes
- Clade: Spermatophytes
- Clade: Angiosperms
- Clade: Eudicots
- Clade: Rosids
- Order: Myrtales
- Family: Myrtaceae
- Genus: Eucalyptus
- Species: E. extensa

Binomial name
- Eucalyptus extensa L.A.S.Johnson & K.D.Hill

= Eucalyptus extensa =

Species of eucalyptus

Eucalyptus extensa is a species of mallet that is endemic to Western Australia. It has smooth bark, lance-shaped adult leaves, flower buds in groups of seven, yellowish green flowers and hemispherical fruit with the valves extended well beyond the level of the rim.

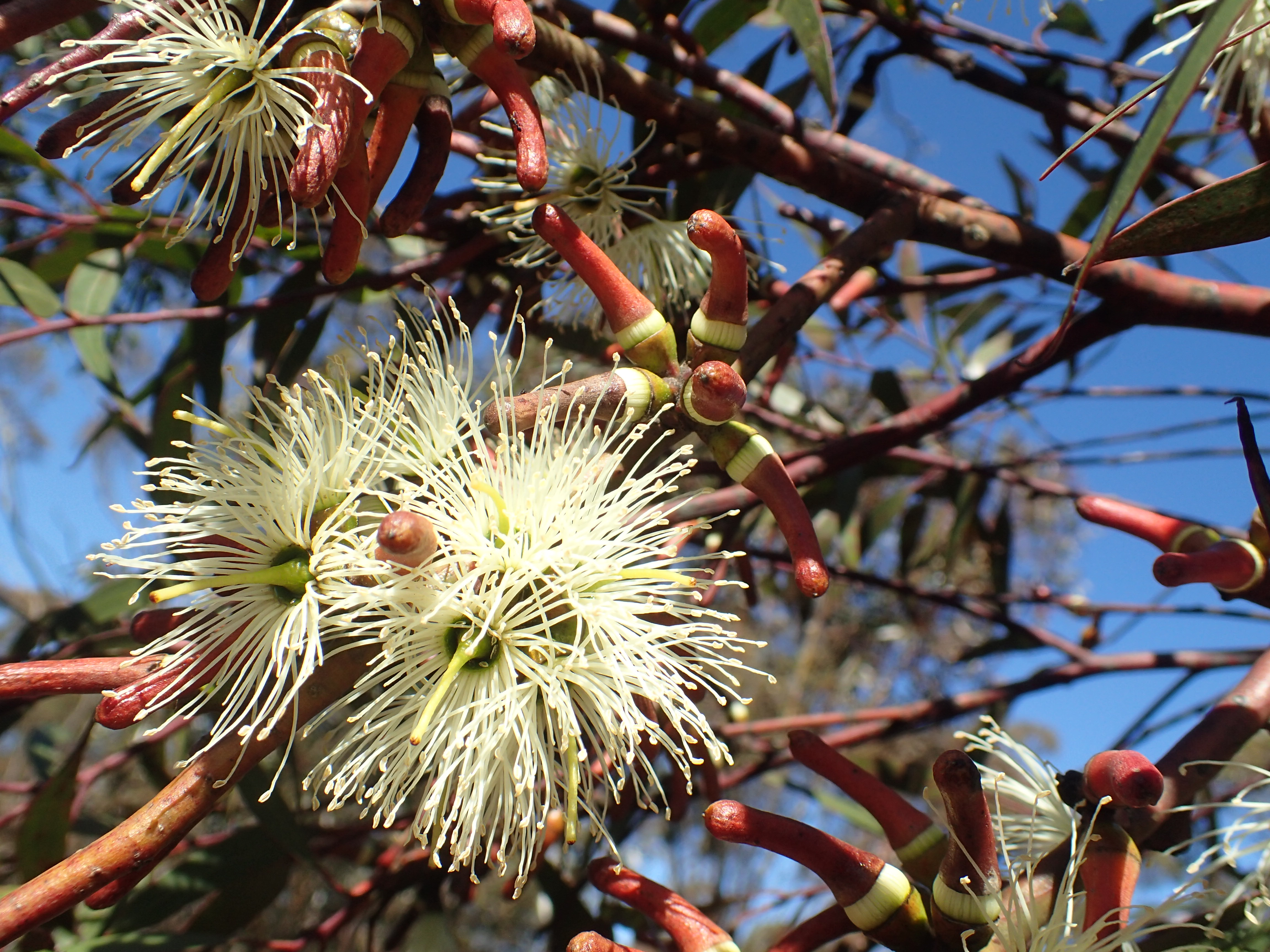
Flowers and buds

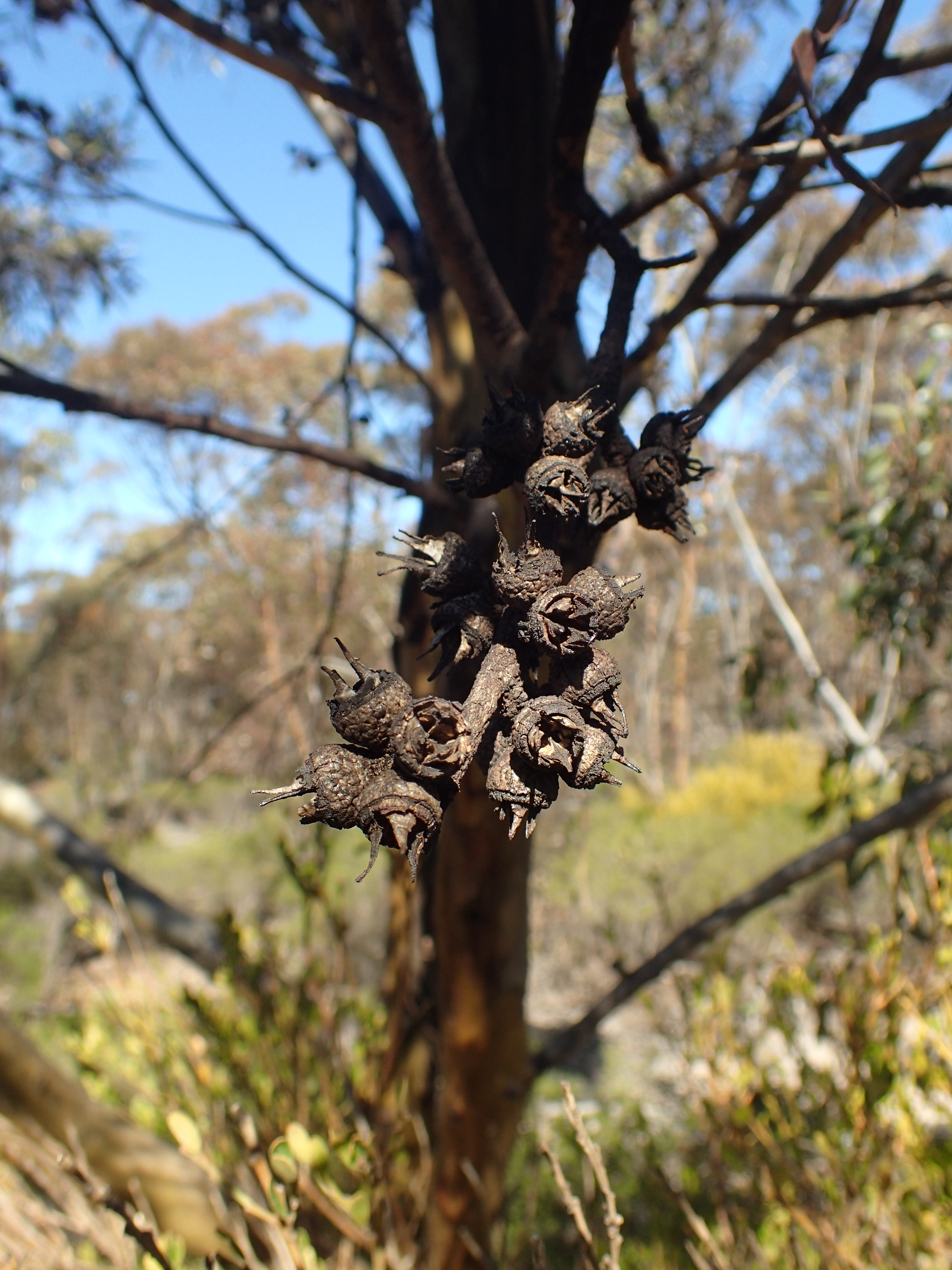
Fruit

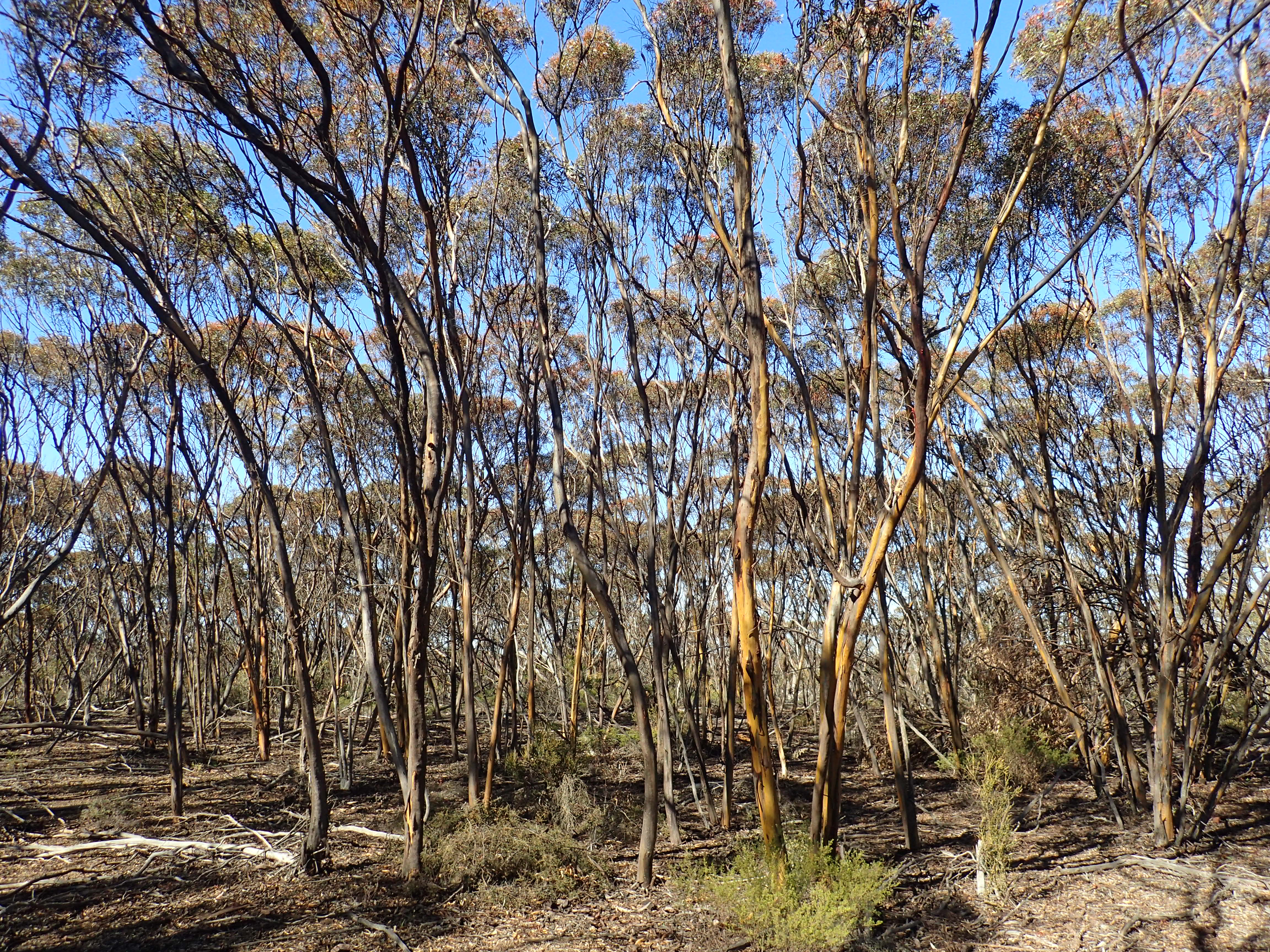
Habit

== Description ==
Eucalyptus extensa is a mallet that typically grows to a height of 3–8 m (9.8–26.2 ft) but does not form a lignotuber. It has smooth, powdery, grey or grey-brown to green or yellow bark. Adult leaves are narrow to broadly lance-shaped, the same glossy dark green on both sides, 10–105 mm (0.39–4.13 in) long and 7–18 mm (0.28–0.71 in) wide on a petiole 6–17 mm (0.24–0.67 in) long. The flower buds are arranged in leaf axils in groups of seven on an unbranched, flattened peduncle 5–15 mm (0.20–0.59 in) long, the individual buds on pedicels 2–6 mm (0.079–0.236 in) long. Mature buds are 24–32 mm (0.94–1.26 in) long and 5–7 mm (0.20–0.28 in) wide with a tapering operculum up to five times as long as the floral cup. Flowering has been recorded in March and October and the flowers are yellowish green. The fruit is a woody, hemispherical capsule 6–8 mm (0.24–0.31 in) long and 8–12 mm (0.31–0.47 in) wide with a narrow disc and three or four valves that extend well beyond the level of the rim. The seeds are brown to straw-coloured, cuboid to ovoid and 1.8–3 mm (0.071–0.118 in) long.

== Taxonomy ==
Eucalyptus extensa was first formally described in 1991 by the botanists Lawrence Alexander Sidney Johnson and Ken Hill in the journal Telopea, from a specimen collected near the road between Hyden and Norseman. The specific epithet is taken from the Latin word extensus meaning "stretched out or extended" in reference to the long opercula on the buds.

== Distribution ==
This mallet occurs on sandplains and undulating areas along the south of Western Australia in the southern Wheatbelt and south western Goldfields-Esperance regions where it grows in red loam, grey sandy loam and sometimes gravelly soils.

== Conservation status ==
This eucalypt is classified as "not threatened" by the Western Australian Government Department of Parks and Wildlife.

== See also ==
- List of Eucalyptus species
