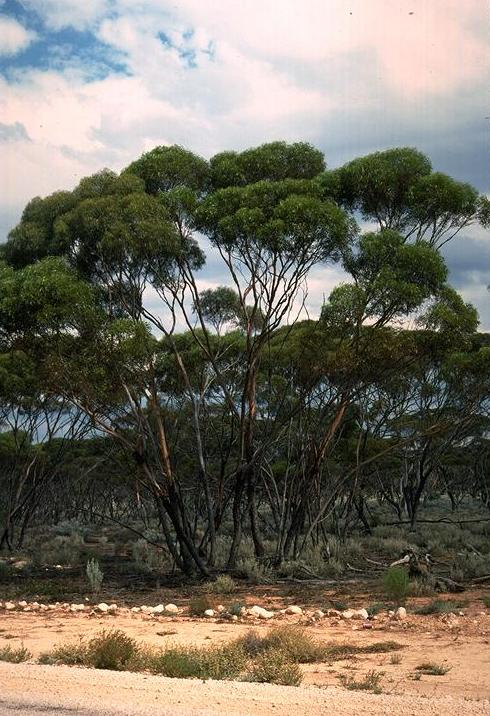

Scientific classification
- Kingdom: Plantae
- Clade: Tracheophytes
- Clade: Angiosperms
- Clade: Eudicots
- Clade: Rosids
- Order: Myrtales
- Family: Myrtaceae
- Genus: Eucalyptus
- Species: E. melanoxylon

Binomial name
- Eucalyptus melanoxylon Maiden

= Eucalyptus melanoxylon =

Black morrell

Species of eucalyptus

Eucalyptus melanoxylon, commonly known as black morrell, is a species of small to medium-sized tree that is endemic to Western Australia. It has hard, fissured bark on some or all of its trunk, linear to narrow lance-shaped leaves, flower buds in groups of between seven and fifteen, white flowers and conical to cup-shaped fruit.

== Description ==
Eucalyptus melanoxylon is a tree that typically grows to a height of 4–24 m (13–79 ft), sometimes a robust mallee, and forms a lignotuber. It has hard, thick, fissured bark on the trunk and larger branches or sometimes only on the lower half, and white to greyish bark above. Young plants and coppice regrowth have dull greenish leaves that are lance-shaped, 40–75 mm (1.6–3.0 in) long and 12–30 mm (0.47–1.18 in) wide. Adult leaves are the same glossy green on both surfaces, linear to narrow lance-shaped, 72–110 mm (2.8–4.3 in) long and 7–12 mm (0.28–0.47 in) wide on a petiole 7–15 mm (0.28–0.59 in) long. The flower buds are arranged in groups of between seven and fifteen on an unbranched peduncle 8–15 mm (0.31–0.59 in) long, the individual buds on pedicels 3–5 mm (0.12–0.20 in) long. Mature buds are oval, 5–8 mm (0.20–0.31 in) long and 3–5 mm (0.12–0.20 in) wide with a conical to rounded operculum. Flowering occurs between November and March and the flowers are white. The fruit is a woody conical to cup-shaped capsule 4–6 mm (0.16–0.24 in) long and 5–6 mm (0.20–0.24 in) wide with the valves protruding.

== Taxonomy ==
Eucalyptus melanoxylon was first formally described in 1923 by Joseph Maiden in his book, A Critical Revision of the Genus Eucalyptus from specimens collected near Westonia. The specific epithet (melanoxylon) means "black wood", alluding to the very dark colour of the timber.

== Distribution and habitat ==
Black morrell occurs in southern Western Australia from Westonia, Bullabulling and Lake King in the eastern wheatbelt to Balladonia in the eastern goldfields. It is found in depressions and on flats where it grows in sand-clay-loamy soils.

== Conservation status ==
This eucalypt is classified as "not threatened" by the Western Australian Government Department of Parks and Wildlife.

== Uses ==
The heartwood of this species is a dark brown colour with visible growth rings. The wood is quite dense, with an air-dry density of 1,130 kg/m^{3} (1,900 lb/cu yd) and a green density of 1,165 kg/m^{3} (1,964 lb/cu yd). It is quite workable and is suitable for woodturning, sanding and finishing.

== See also ==
- List of Eucalyptus species
