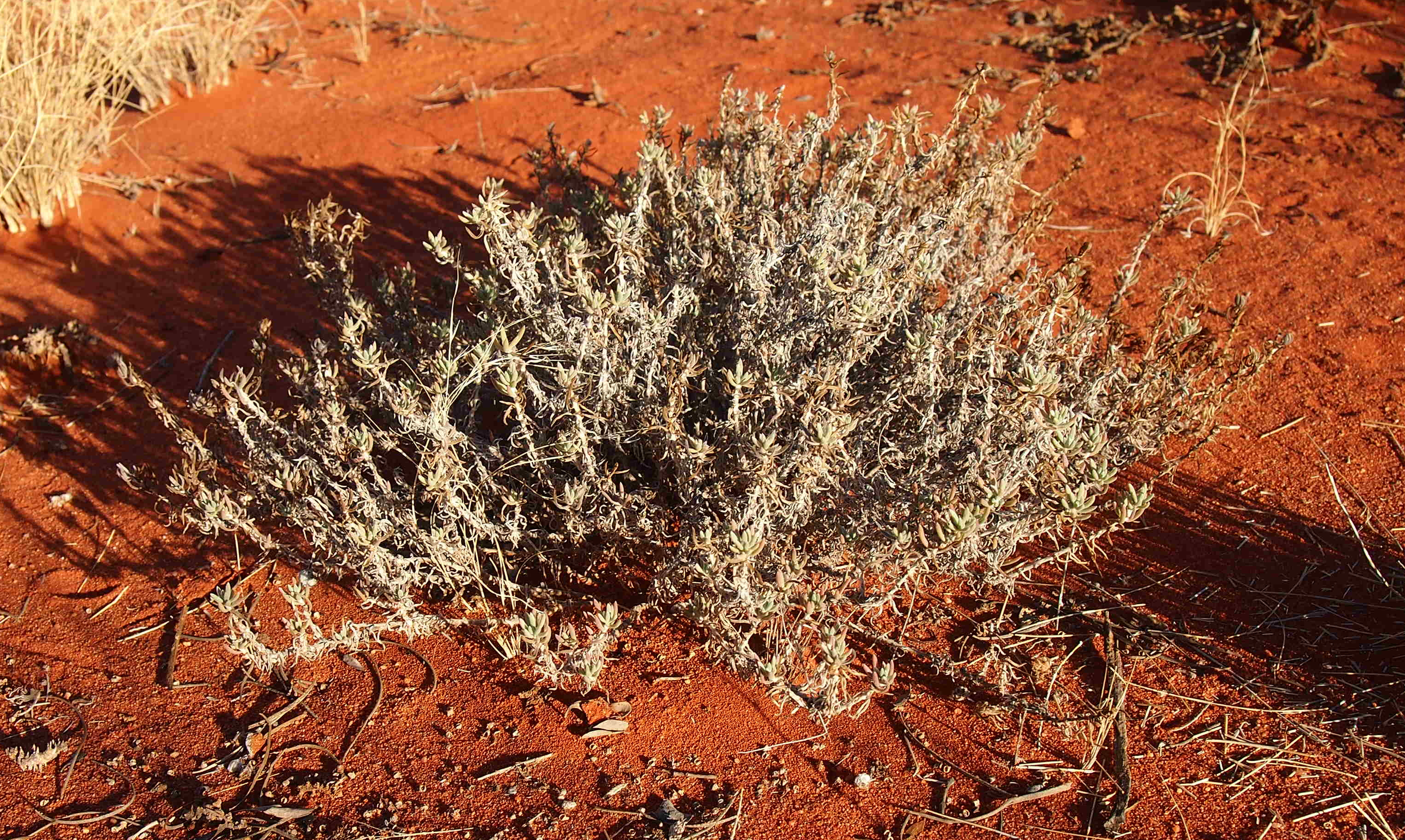
- Habit
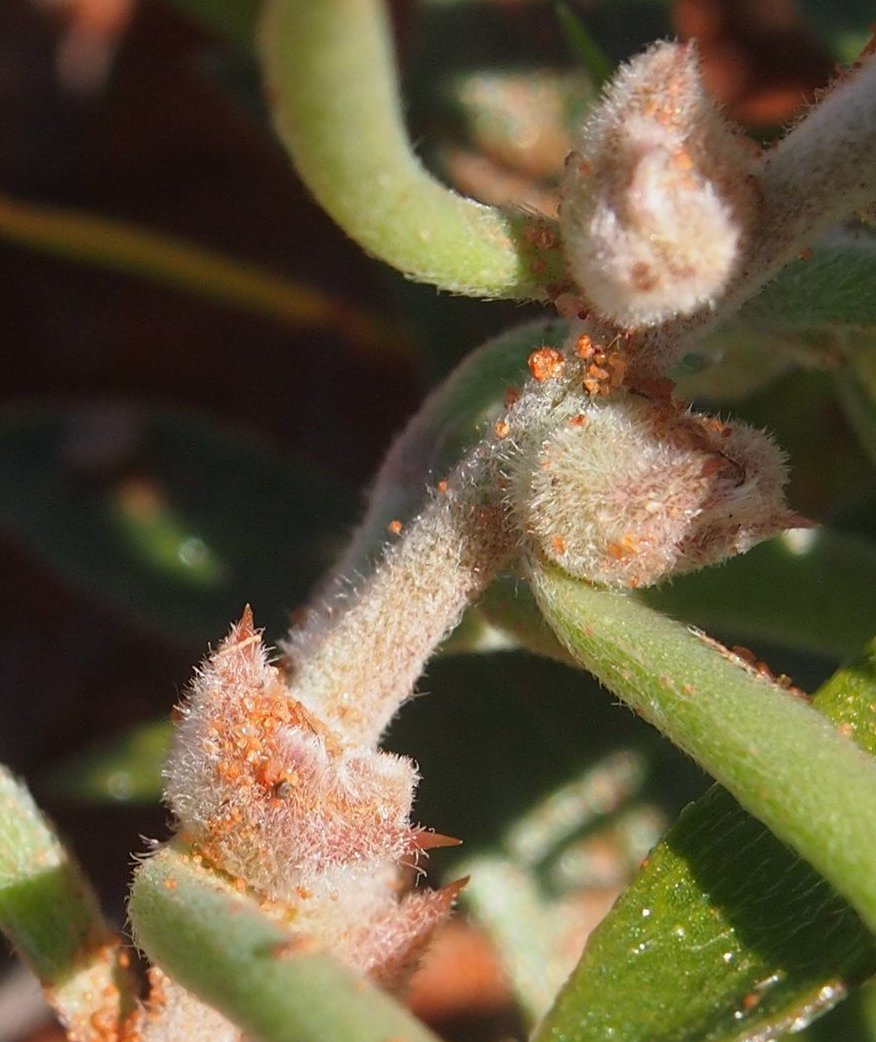
- Close-up of fruit

Scientific classification
- Kingdom: Plantae
- Clade: Embryophytes
- Clade: Tracheophytes
- Clade: Spermatophytes
- Clade: Angiosperms
- Clade: Eudicots
- Order: Caryophyllales
- Family: Amaranthaceae
- Genus: Sclerolaena
- Species: S. diacantha

Binomial name
- Sclerolaena diacantha (Nees) Benth.

Synonyms
- Anisacantha diacantha Nees; Anisacantha kentropsidea F.Muell.; Bassia diacantha (Nees) F.Muell.; Chenolea diacantha (Nees) F.Muell.; Enchylaena falcatula Gand.; Kentropsis diacantha (Nees) Moq.

= Sclerolaena diacantha =

Species of plant in the amaranth family

Sclerolaena diacantha, the grey copperburr, is a species of flowering plant in the family Amaranthaceae, native to Australia (except Tasmania). It is a perennial rounded subshrub reaching 30 cm (12 in), with a widespread distribution.

== Description ==
Sclerolaena diacantha is a prostrate to weakly erect herb or subshrub, with a woody rootstock, that typically reaches up to 30 cm in height. The branches are densely covered in short grey woolly hairs, accounting for one of its common names, grey copperburr. Its leaves are linear, flattened and succulent, growing up to 25 mm, and are moderately covered with short hairs.

The most distinctive feature is its fruiting perianth which is tough, thick walled and hairy. The base of the perianth is hollow and attaches to the side of the stem. With two diverging spines 1.5 – 5 mm long, extend from the fruiting perianth, with of the spines bearing a short blunt tubercle at the base of it, and rarely there is a third short spine adjacent to the other. Such spines are characteristic of the Sclerolaena genus, and are helpful in distinguishing it from related chenopod shrubs. The plants seeds are held horizontally in the fruit, and it fruits throughout most of the year.

== Taxonomy ==
In 1870 the species was transferred to its current genus Sclerolaena by George Bentham in his Flora Australis. Prior to then the species has had many taxonomic synonyms, due to frequent reclassifications across the chenopod family. These synonyms include Bassia diacantha (Nees) F. Muell, Anisacntha diacantha (Nees) in Lehm, and Chenolea diacantha (Nees) F. Muell.

Scherolaena is part of the Amaranthaceae family, after the reclassification of the former family chenopodiaceae, which is now treated as a sub family (Chenopodioideae).

== Distribution and habitat ==
Sclerolaena diacantha is a common and widespread species across arid and semi arid Australia. It occurs across a broad range being found in western Victoria, western New South Wales, South Australia, Northern Territory and Western Australia. In New South Wales the species is recorded as far east as the western slopes, then further west across the rest of the state. In Victoria it is largely restricted to the northwestern corner however there are some pockets as far south as Bacchus Marsh.

The species is characteristic of chenopod shrublands, typically growing on red earths, grey clays and other fine textured soils plains and low-lying areas. The species does not require large amounts of rainfall with it being found at Fowlers Gap Arid Zone Research Station which has an average annual rainfall total of approximately 240mm. The species is also associated with disturbed and grazed sites, where it tends to increase in abundance under grazing pressure relative to perennial grasses, and is very persistent through drought conditions when other species start to decline.

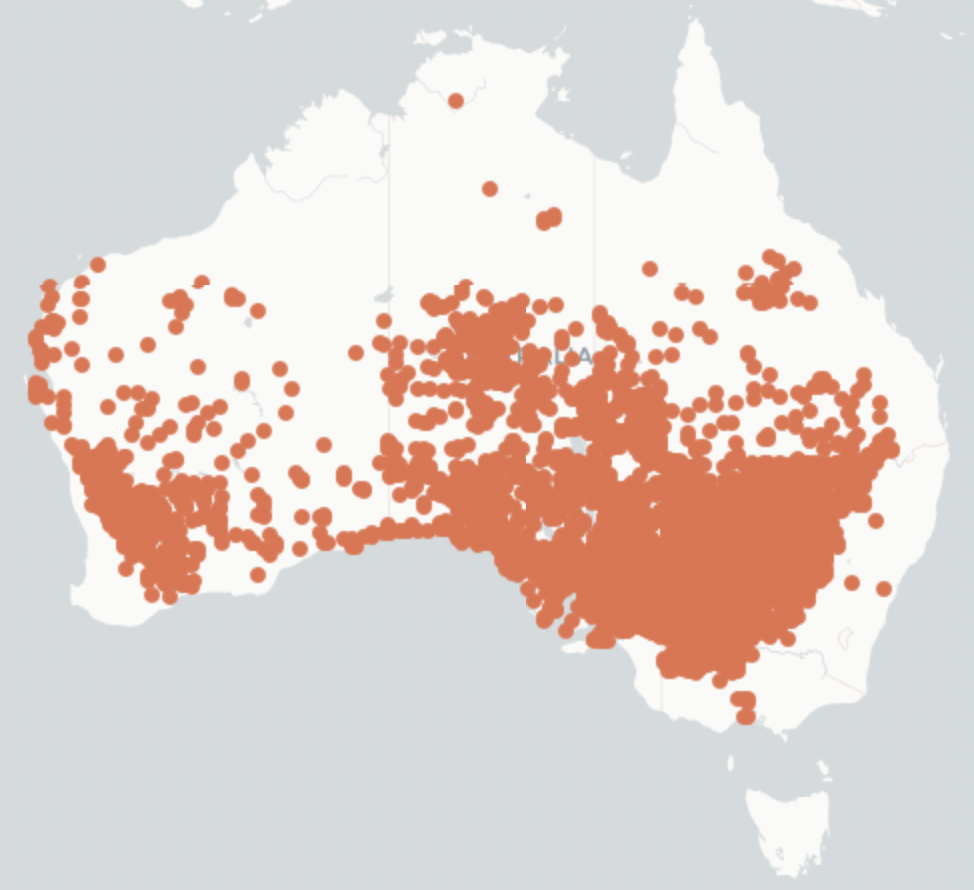
Distribution map of Sclerolaena diacantha across Australia

== Ecology ==
Sclerolaena diacantha plays an important role in arid and semi-arid chenopod shrubland ecology. It is a highly palatable and nutritious with the highest digestibility among recorded perennial forbs in semi-arid woodland communities. Its persistence through dry seasons and drought makes it a reliable foraging resource for grazing animals during periods when other species decline.

=== Seed dispersal ===
The species has an unusual and variable seed dispersal method. At most sites, the woody diaspores fall to the ground upon maturation and are dispersed randomly by wind or episodic flooding. Although at sites where the ant Rhytidoponera sp. B is present, the diaspores which have a soft food body are actively collected by workers, which consume the food body and discard the seed. As a result, thousands of seeds accumulate on ant mounds, and the plant is often found growing directly on them.

This ant mediated dispersal, has measurable genetic consequences for S. diacantha populations. At sites where ant dispersal is active, the directional and repeated deposition of seeds in ant territories creates moderate to strong local spatial genetic structure. That is, plants growing in close proximity to one another tend to be more genetically similar. At sites without ant dispersal, where seeds are distributed more randomly, by the wind and water, this spatial genetic structure is mostly absent. The species is also highly inbred, with self-pollination accounting for 70% of seed set.

=== Insect interaction ===
Sclerolaena diacantha is the host plant for several invertebrate species. The gall midge Asphondylia mcneilli induces galls in the flowers of the plant, the infested flowers then develop into galls and produce no viable seeds. The combined effects of gall midges and ant dispersal concentrating viable seeds on mounds show contrasting pressures on the reproductivity of the species.

=== Response to grazing ===
Under pastoral conditions, S. diacantha typically increases in abundance relative to perennial grasses when there is high grazing pressure. In contrast, on sites exclosed from grazing, perennial grasses become dominant and S. diacantha declines in relative abundance, suggesting that while the species is quite tolerant to grazing it is also a weak competitor under undisturbed conditions.

== Conservation ==
Sclerolanaena diacantha is not considered to be of conservation concern. It is listed as least concern due to its broad range and abundance across arid and semi-arid Australia. Its tolerance to grazing and persistence through drought likely contribute to its stability as a species.
