= Kopi mallee =

Kopi Mallee could refer to the following species of Eucalyptus:

- Eucalyptus striaticalyx
- Eucalyptus gypsophila
