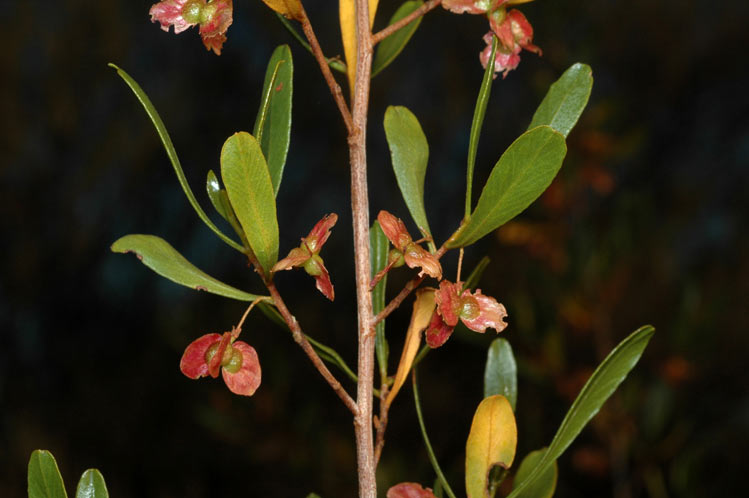

Scientific classification
- Kingdom: Plantae
- Clade: Tracheophytes
- Clade: Angiosperms
- Clade: Eudicots
- Clade: Rosids
- Order: Sapindales
- Family: Sapindaceae
- Genus: Dodonaea
- Species: D. pachyneura

Binomial name
- Dodonaea pachyneura F.Muell.

= Dodonaea pachyneura =

Species of shrub

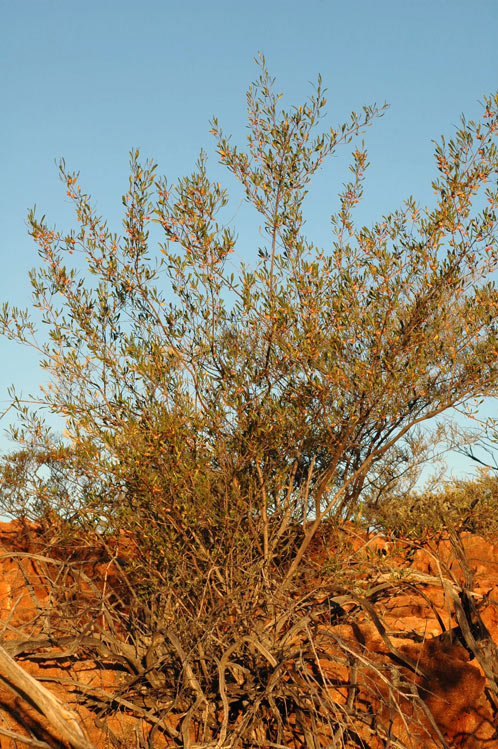
Habit near the Carnarvon - Mullewa Road

Dodonaea pachyneura is a species of plant in the family Sapindaceae and is endemic to northern Australia. It is an erect, dioecious shrub with simple sessile linear or lance-shaped leaves, flowers arranged in cyme, the flowers usually with three sepals and six stamens, and capsules with usually three wings.

== Description ==
Dodonaea pachyneura is an erect dioecious shrub that typically grows to a height of up to 4 m (13 ft). Its leaves are simple, linear or lance-shaped with the narrower end towards the base, 20–60 mm (0.79–2.36 in) long and 2–7 mm (0.079–0.276 in) wide and sessile or tapering to a petiole 3–12 mm (0.12–0.47 in) long. The flowers are arranged a few-flowered cyme, each flower on a pedicel 1.5–4 mm (0.059–0.157 in) long, usually with three lance-shaped to egg-shaped sepals, 1.2–1.7 mm (0.047–0.067 in) long and usually six stamens. The ovary is glabrous. The fruit is usually a three-winged, egg-shaped capsule 6–9 mm (0.24–0.35 in) long and 11–16 mm (0.43–0.63 in) wide with membranous wings 2.5–5.5 mm (0.098–0.217 in) wide.

== Taxonomy ==
Dodonaea pachyneura was first formally described in 1886 by Ferdinand von Mueller in Plants Collected in Capricornic Western Australia, by H.S. King Esq.. The specific epithet (pachyneura) means 'thick-nerved'.

== Distribution and habitat ==
This species of Dodonaea grows on rocky hillsides and ironstone ridges on sandy or stony soils between the Hamersley Range, Robinson Ranges and Lake Barlee in the Carnarvon, Gascoyne, Murchison and Pilbara bioregions of northern Western Australia.

== Conservation status ==
Dodonaea pachyneura is listed as "not threatened" by the Government of Western Australia Department of Biodiversity, Conservation and Attractions.
