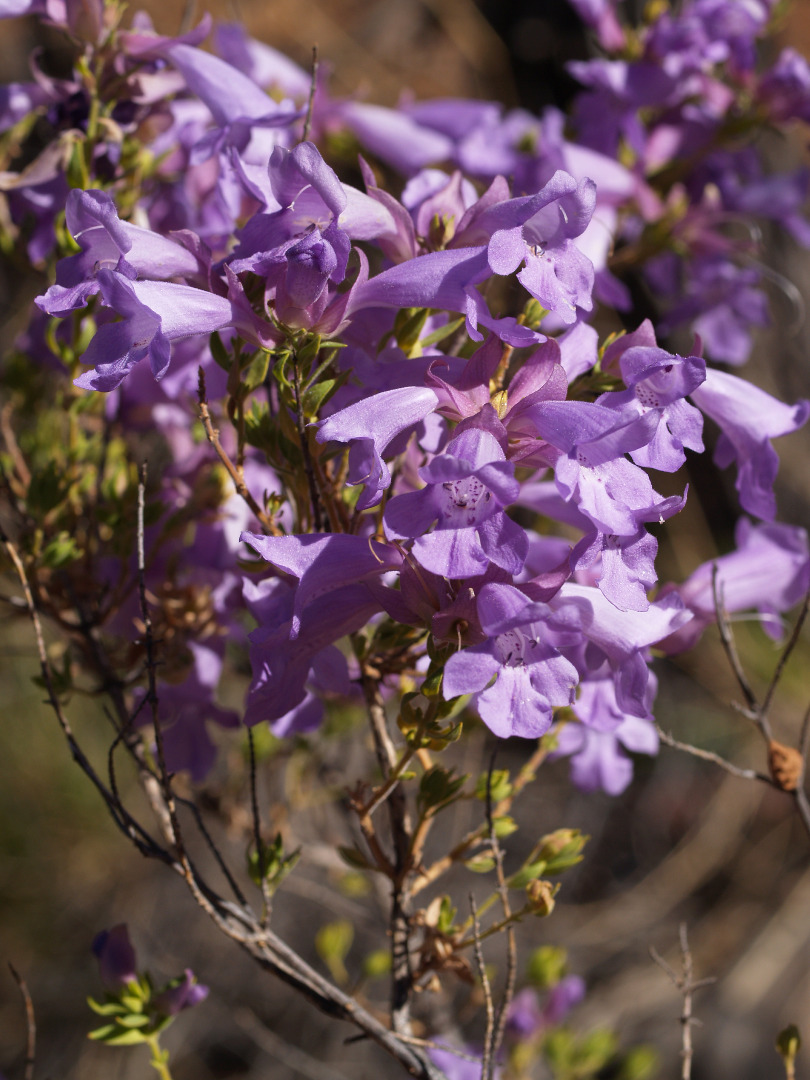
- Near Wiluna

Conservation status
- Priority Three — Poorly Known Taxa (DEC)

Scientific classification
- Kingdom: Plantae
- Clade: Tracheophytes
- Clade: Angiosperms
- Clade: Eudicots
- Clade: Asterids
- Order: Lamiales
- Family: Lamiaceae
- Genus: Prostanthera
- Species: P. ferricola

Binomial name
- Prostanthera ferricola B.J.Conn & K.A.Sheph.
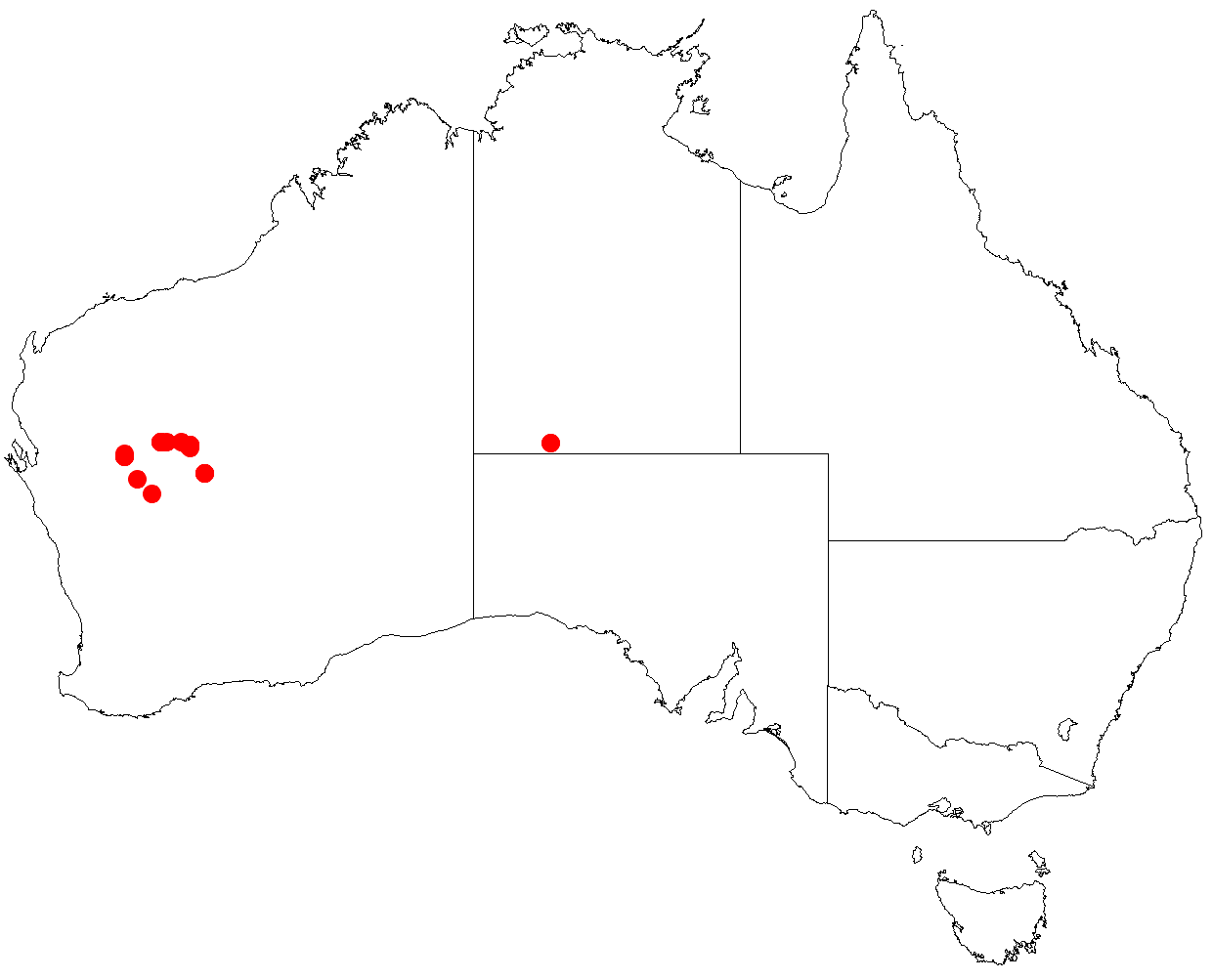
- Occurrence data from AVH

= Prostanthera ferricola =

Species of flowering plant

Prostanthera ferricola is a species of flowering plant in the family Lamiaceae and is endemic to central Western Australia. It is an erect, openly branched shrub with aromatic, egg-shaped leaves and mauve-purple flowers arranged in four to twelve leaf axils near the end of branchlets.

== Description ==
Prostanthera ferricola is an erect, openly branched shrub that typically grows to a height of 0.3–1 m (1 ft 0 in – 3 ft 3 in) and has cylindrical, densely hairy, glandular branchlets. The leaves are egg-shaped, strongly aromatic when crushed, 5.5–10 mm (0.22–0.39 in) long and 1.5–2.5 mm (0.059–0.098 in) wide on a petiole 0.5–1 mm (0.020–0.039 in) long. The flowers are arranged singly in four to twelve leaf axils near the ends of branchlets, each flower on a pedicel 0.7–1.5 mm (0.028–0.059 in) long. The sepals form a tube 2.5–3 mm (0.098–0.118 in) long with two lobes, the lower lobe green or faintly purple and 5–6 mm (0.20–0.24 in) long, the upper lobe purple-mauve and 11–13 mm (0.43–0.51 in) long. The petals are mauve-purple, 18–20 mm (0.71–0.79 in) long and form a tube 15–18 mm (0.59–0.71 in) long with two lips. The lower lip has three lobes, the centre lobe egg-shaped, 5–6 mm (0.20–0.24 in) long and 9–10 mm (0.35–0.39 in) wide and the side lobes 5.5–6 mm (0.22–0.24 in) long and 4–4.5 mm (0.16–0.18 in) wide. The upper lip is broadly egg-shaped, 6.5–7 mm (0.26–0.28 in) long and 8–9 mm (0.31–0.35 in) wide and deeply divided into two lobes. Flowering occurs from July to September.

== Taxonomy ==
Prostanthera ferricola was first formally described in 1987 by Barry Conn and Kelly Anne Shepherd in the journal Nuytsia from specimens collected in the Robinson Ranges in 2006.

== Distribution and habitat ==
This mintbush grows in sparse Acacia aneura shrubland in the Murchison and Gascoyne biogeographic regions of Western Australia.

== Conservation status ==
Prostanthera ferricola is classified "Priority Three" by the Government of Western Australia Department of Parks and Wildlife meaning that it is poorly known and known from only a few locations but is not under imminent threat.
