= Pencell Pool =

Pencell Pool is a natural pool on the Murchison River in Mid West Western Australia. It is located on the Coolcalalaya Road about 8 kilometres east of Galena Bridge.

It is of geological interest because its steep cliffs expose excellent examples of Ordovician Tumblagooda Sandstone, containing trace fossils of Skolithos and probably Diplocraterion. The Tumblagooda Sandstone sits unconformably on gneiss of the 1100 Ma Northampton Metamorphic Complex, with a 200 m thick sequence exposed along the western bank of the pool.

The pool is considered to be in excellent condition, and is an important research site. It was nominated to the Register of the National Estate in 1992, but is not registered at present, being treated rather as an "Indicative Place".
