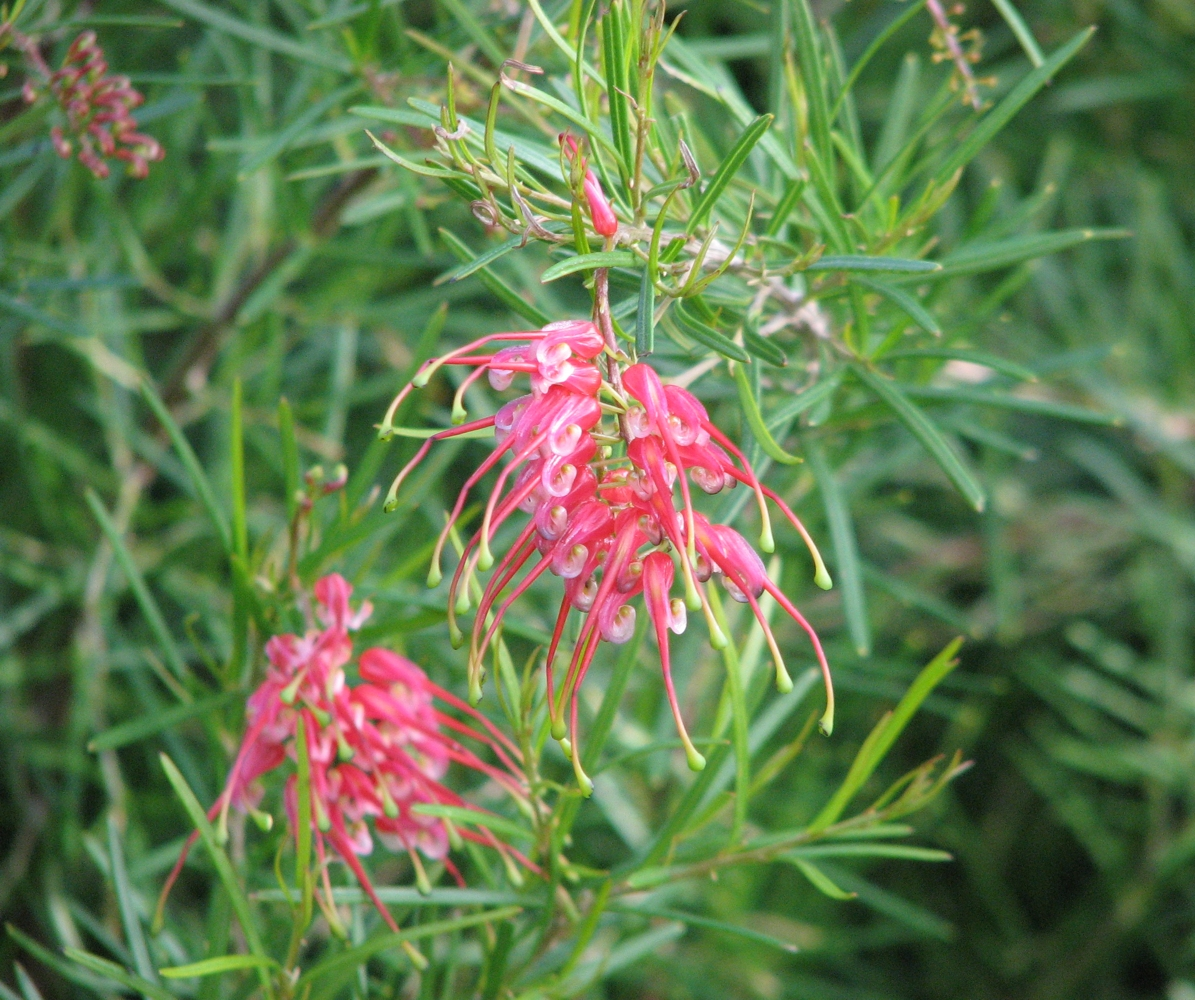

Scientific classification
- Kingdom: Plantae
- Clade: Tracheophytes
- Clade: Angiosperms
- Clade: Eudicots
- Order: Proteales
- Family: Proteaceae
- Genus: Grevillea
- Species: G. pinaster

Binomial name
- Grevillea pinaster Meisn.

Synonyms
- ? Grevillea pinaster var. brevifolia Benth.; Grevillea pinaster Meisn. var. pinaster; Grevillea thelemanniana subsp. pinaster (Meisn.) McGill.

= Grevillea pinaster =

Species of shrub endemic to Western Australia

Grevillea pinaster is a species of flowering plant in the family Proteaceae and is endemic to the south-west of Western Australia. It is an erect shrub with linear leaves and pinkish-red to red flowers, the style with a yellowish tip.

== Description ==
Grevillea pinaster is usually an erect shrub that typically grows to a height of 2–3 m (6 ft 7 in – 9 ft 10 in), sometimes a low, spreading shrub 2–3 m (6 ft 7 in – 9 ft 10 in) wide. Its leaves are linear, 25–80 mm (0.98–3.15 in) long and 0.5–2 mm (0.020–0.079 in) wide, sometimes with 2 to 5 linear lobes 10–40 mm (0.39–1.57 in) long. The upper surface is glabrous, the edges turned down or rolled under obscuring the lower surface. The flowers are arranged in clusters of 12 to 20 on a rachis 5–20 mm (0.20–0.79 in) long and are pinkish-red to red and mostly glabrous, the pistil 20–25 mm (0.79–0.98 in) long. The end of the style is yellowish. Flowering mainly occurs from May to September and the fruit is an oblong to elliptic follicle 10–13 mm (0.39–0.51 in) long.

== Taxonomy ==
Grevillea pinaster was first formally described by Carl Meissner in Hooker's Journal of Botany and Kew Garden Miscellany in 1855, from material collected by James Drummond. The specific epithet (pinaster) means "imitation pine".

== Distribution and habitat ==
This grevillea grows in shrubland and heath, often near creeks, and mainly occurs between the Murchison River, Eneabba and Mullewa in the Avon Wheatbelt, Geraldton Sandplains and Swan Coastal Plain bioregions of south-western Western Australia.

== Conservation status ==
Grevillea pinaster is listed as "not threatened" by the Government of Western Australia Department of Biodiversity, Conservation and Attractions.

Plants labelled as Grevillea stenomera in plant nurseries are often forms or hybrids of this species.
