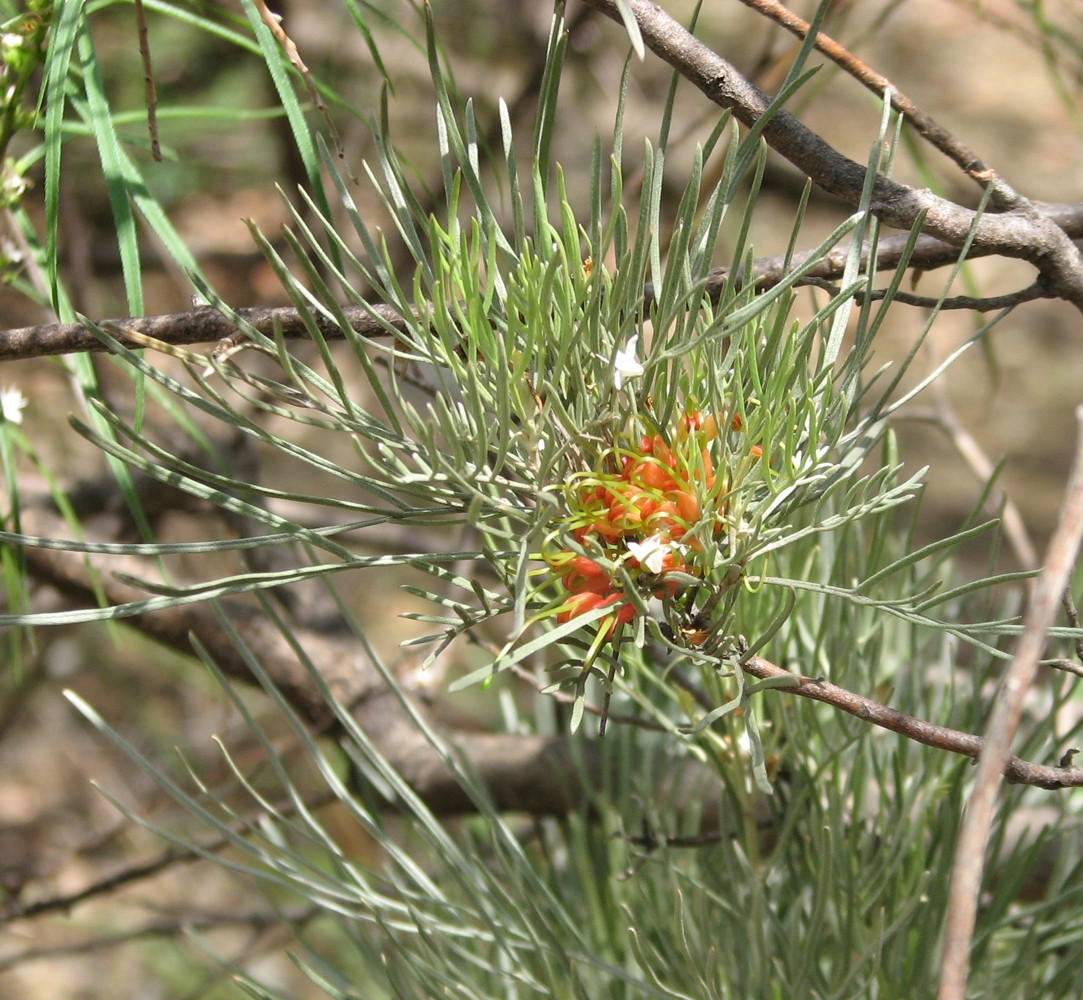
- Grevillea stenomera in Maranoa Gardens

Conservation status
- Priority Two — Poorly Known Taxa (DEC)

Scientific classification
- Kingdom: Plantae
- Clade: Tracheophytes
- Clade: Angiosperms
- Clade: Eudicots
- Order: Proteales
- Family: Proteaceae
- Genus: Grevillea
- Species: G. stenomera

Binomial name
- Grevillea stenomera F.Muell.

= Grevillea stenomera =

Lace net grevillea

Species of shrub endemic to Western Australia

Grevillea stenomera, commonly known as lace net grevillea, is a species of flowering plant in the family Proteaceae and is endemic to near-coastal areas in the west of Western Australia. It is a rounded, glaucous shrub with pinnatisect leaves with 5 to 15 linear lobes, and pinkish and greenish-yellow flowers with a greenish style.

== Description ==
Grevillea stenomera is a rounded, silvery to bluish grey shrub that typically grows to a height of 0.9–2.2 m (2 ft 11 in – 7 ft 3 in) and has silky-hairy branchlets and a lignotuber. The leaves are pinnatisect, with 5 to 15 linear lobes 40–125 mm (1.6–4.9 in) long and 0.8–2.2 mm (0.031–0.087 in) wide on one side of the leaf stalk. The edges of the leaflets are rolled under concealing the lower surface apart from the midrib. The flowers are arranged in clusters of 20 to 30 along a silky- to softly-hairy rachis 35–60 mm (1.4–2.4 in) long. The flowers are pale-pink, orange-pink or reddish-pink, and greenish-yellow with a greenish style, the pistil 22–24 mm (0.87–0.94 in) long. Flowering mainly occurs from August to October and the fruit is a wrinkled, oblong follicle 10–13 mm (0.39–0.51 in) long.

== Taxonomy ==
Grevillea stenomera was first formally described in 1864 by botanist Ferdinand von Mueller in his Fragmenta Phytographiae Australiae from specimens collected near the Murchison River by Augustus Oldfield. The specific epithet (stenomera) means "narrow leaflets".

== Distribution and habitat ==
Lace net grevillea is usually found in coastal scrub communities growing in sandy soils over or near limestone. The range of the plant extends from around Tamala Station, just south of Shark Bay, in the north down to around Kalbarri in the south and is found fairly close to the coast in the Geraldton Sandplains and Yalgoo bioregions of western Western Australia.

== Conservation status ==
Grevillea stenomera is listed as "Priority Two" by the Western Australian Government Department of Biodiversity, Conservation and Attractions, meaning that it is poorly known and from only one or a few locations.

== Use in horticulture ==
The Grevillea cultivar sold by plant nurseries as "Grevillea stenomera prostrate red" is thought to be a hybrid of Grevillea pinaster.

== See also ==
- List of Grevillea species
