= Tumblagooda Sandstone =

Geological formation in Western Australia

- Stratigraphic range: Ordovician-Silurian
- Type: Geological formation
- Unit of: Carnarvon & Perth Basins
- Overlies: Proterozoic basement
- Thickness: 1,300–3,500 m (4,300–11,500 ft)

Lithology
- Primary: Sandstone

Location
- Coordinates: 27.7°S 114.1°E
- Region: Western Australia
- Country: Australia
- Extent: Carnarvon Basin

Type section
- Named for: Tumblagooda

The Tumblagooda Sandstone is a geological formation deposited during the Silurian or Ordovician periods, between four and five hundred million years ago, and is now exposed on the west coast of Australia in river and coastal gorges near the tourist town of Kalbarri, Kalbarri National Park and the Murchison River gorge, straddling the boundary of the Carnarvon and Perth basins. Visible trackways are interpreted by some to be the earliest evidence of fully terrestrial animals.

== Sedimentology ==
The Tumblagooda ranges between 1,300 and 3,500 metres (4,300 and 11,500 ft) in thickness. The base of the formation is not exposed, but geophysical data (primarily magnetic) indicate the sandstone unconformably overlies a Proterozoic basement. The formation is divided into four facies associations (FAs), numbered stratigraphically, that occur sequentially from bottom to top. These lithified sediments portray an environment dominated by high-energy braided streams flowing into the sea; some parts have been interpreted as reflecting deposition in ephemeral pools controlled by water table rise and fall, but alternative interpretations favour deposition on tidal sand flats.

=== Facies association 1 ===
The lowest facies association in the unit is dominated by trough cross-stratification, deposited by broad, high-energy braided rivers, which formed the outwash plain of an alluvial system. Trace fossils are virtually absent, because the high depositional energy meant burrowing organisms could not survive. The downslope flow was to the north west.

=== Facies association 2 ===
These facies reflect a quieter, more distal environment; the unit is occasionally interrupted by lenses of FA1 sediments. There are two published interpretation of the depositional setting of these facies: they were initially interpreted as tidal sand-flat deposits, an interpretation still followed, but subsequently as continental eolian deposits. The second interpretation is described below. Beds are on the whole thin, planar and well sorted. Beds about 5 centimeters (2.0 in) thick form 2 meters (6.6 ft) units of "bedded sandsheets"—layers of sand blown by the wind—which form a characteristic lithology of this facies. Eolian indicators such as adhesion surfaces and warts are widespread, but may simply indicate regular emergence in an intertidal setting rather than support for eolian deposition and dunes.

Low angle (<20°), cross-stratified sandstones form units up to 50 centimeters (20 in) thick, rarely reaching thicknesses as much as 2 meters (6.6 ft). The current directions here are to the southeast – up slope – and was considered to reinforce their interpretation as aeolian dunes. They are alternatively interpreted as superficial bars and channel deposits on lower and middle intertidal zones, a far less controversial interpretation given their intimate association with intensely bioturbated rocks. FA2 also contains a dense, varied trace fossil assemblage, taken by some as indicative of a tidal, marine-influenced setting, given the Tumblagooda Sandstone clearly predates the widespread development of land plants. Current and wave ripple marks are also widespread, which may have formed on tidal flats as water depths varied, or perhaps in shallow streams, with flooded hollows hosting the creators of the trace fossils. Cyclicity is poorly shown or absent, suggesting that, rather than being seasonal events, the occasional inundation was based on unpredictable events such as storms, a varying water table, and changing stream courses.

=== Facies association 3 ===
This facies is much like FA1, with an increased supply of clastic material represented in the sedimentary record by coarse-grained, poorly sorted, upwards-fining (i.e. largest grains at the bottom of the unit, becoming progressively finer towards the top), pebbly trough cross-bedded units up to four metres thick. Trace fossils are rare, other than near the top of the association, and consist of sinuous trails and short vertical burrows. Sheet-like braided rivers are inferred as the dominant control on sedimentation in these facies.

=== Facies association 4 ===
The uppermost facies association appears to reflect an environment on the fringes of the sea. Fining-up is observed on 0.5 meters (1.6 ft) to 2 meters (6.6 ft) scales, with trough cross bedding at the bases of units overlain by current ripples. Fine sandstones and green shales are also present. The upper units are strongly bioturbated, with an abundance of vertical burrow such as Skolithos, a fossil typically found in marine environments.

It has been interpreted as an inter-distributary bay, or alternatively as a sandy coastline featuring wave-generated bars, perhaps with tidal influence; braided fluvial streams often reworked the sediments. In either case, it is clearly fluvial-dominated deposition in a coastal setting, and may simply be a distal equivalent of FA3, where there was a siltier, slightly more marine, background setting with periodic influx of fluvially dominated, coastally situated distributary channel complexes, rather than specifically interdistributary bay deposition.

== Age ==
Since the Tumblagooda Sandstone comprises a sedimentary succession with no volcanic layers (which could be dated radiometrically) and with virtually no body fossils, its age is very difficult to constrain. It was first thought to have formed around 100 million years ago, during the Cretaceous period, on the basis of stratigraphy; current estimates place it far earlier, in the Early Ordovician, 440 million years ago. It is hoped that a new technique based on the uranium-thorium dating of diagenetic monazite crystals may produce a more precise estimate of the age, but initial attempts have failed to extract sufficient monazite from the unit.

Such a method would be of great value, as previous attempts to date the unit have been rather inconsistent. The initial Cretaceous estimate was soon reviewed with a "mid-Cambrian to early Ordovician" (~500 million years ago) estimate based on trace fossils, and was shortly afterwards replaced by a mid-Silurian age based on spores and acritarchs. This was apparently confirmed by the identification in the overlying beds of a conodont fauna with a recognizably Silurian character, but when the palæomagnetism of the area was studied, an early Ordovician age was deduced. A single conodont element, again drawn from overlying sediments, was taken to support a late Cambrian to early Ordovician age, but this was refuted by the observation that the trace fossil assemblages bore great similarity to well constrained lower Silurian assemblages from Antarctica. The current early Ordovician age estimation is based on a much more diverse and numerous—therefore more securely dated—assemblage of conodonts, again from overlying sediments.

== Tectonic history ==
In common with most of the Australian cratonic rocks, the Tumblagooda has undergone minimal tectonic activity since its formation. Faulting is rare (although perhaps unrecognized in inaccessible parts of the gorges) – several new faults were discovered during systematic examination of the gorges, and units continue laterally for great distances. Jointing is the dominant control of the landscape, with incised meanders enhancing joint locations. Miocene uplift has resulted in the formation of deep (approximately 60m/200 ft) gorges exposing large cliff sections; with the sparse vegetation characteristic of arid Western Australia, this means the unit is exceptionally exposed, making detailed study easy in accessible portions of the gorge. Despite this, the unit was not studied until 1948, due to its inaccessibility – the 970 kilometres (600 mi) from Perth were mainly dirt tracks until the 1970s.

== Paleontology ==
Only one body fossil, Kalbarria (an early euthycarcinoidic arthropod) has been found in the Tumblagooda, mainly due to the large clast size and the abundance of predatory and burrowing organisms. (This meant that oxygen could penetrate to good depths in the sediment, permitting decomposing organisms to decay anything that burrowing animals had not eaten too rapidly for fossils to form.) Since Kalbarria had 11 pairs of legs, it can be tentatively matched to some Protichnites arthropod trackways of the same size. Protoichnites is abundant in subaerial facies in FA2-4. Marks which can only have been made on exposed wet sand are seen: for example "splurges" where the legs of the organism flipped sand out behind them. The marks vary in crispness and character according to the wetability of the underlying sediment; this is particularly marked where the traces cross ripples, with the lee slopes recording a trace markedly different in appearance to those in the troughs, and the stoss slopes recording no trace at all. Behaviour can be inferred from these traces; in places, they parallel features which modern observation notes forming at the edge of a wind-blown pond, just on the landward side of the shore. This behaviour has been interpreted as a feeding trace; presumably the trace-maker dined on organic matter blown out of the pool, or detritus left as the pool had shrunk. Further tracks can be traced across dunes; a slow walk up turns into a skid as the organism slid down the lee slope and into the pool on the other side. Another instance shows the trackways of two organisms converging, then becoming one trackway, before one individual swerves away to the left, leaving the other to walk onwards. These trackways are the earliest evidence of terrestrial animals. Due to the poor dating of the unit, it is currently impossible to speculate whether the plants, which colonised the land in the mid-Ordovician, got there first.

Aquatic trace fossils are also abundant. Two major ichnofacies are observed, bearing close resemblance to assemblages found in Antarctica and demonstrating proximity of western Australia and Antarctica at the time of deposition. One is dominated by Skolithos, suggesting marine deposition. The fabric of the other is dominated by Heimdallia, a strange planar trace that does not have a circular cross-section; it is interrupted in places by Beaconella, a wide trace thought to be constructed by a burrowing arthropod ploughing through the sediment for food, leaving a mound of piled sediment at the end of each trace. This may suggest the Beaconella organism feeding on Heimdallia. Daedalus, a trace fossil resembling a giant garlic, is also present in this assemblage.
