= Yalgar =

Yalgar or Yalghar may refer to:

- Yalgaar, a 1992 Indian Hindi-language action crime thriller film by Feroz Khan
- Yalghaar, a 2017 Pakistani film
- "Yalgar", a 2020 song by Wily Frenzy and CarryMinati, later featured in the 2021 Indian film The Big Bull
- Yalgar River, a river in Western Australia
- Yalghar Battalion, of Pakistan Army's Special Service Group
