= Hope River (Western Australia) =

River in Western Australia

Coordinates: 26°05′S 117°55′E

Location
- Country: Australia

Physical characteristics
- Source
  - location: Lake Anneen
  - elevation: 446 metres (1,463 ft)
- Mouth
  - location: Yalgar River
  - elevation: 413 metres (1,355 ft)
- Length: 102 km (63 mi)

Hope River is a river in central Western Australia. It is a tributary of the Yalgar River, which is in turn a tributary of the Murchison River. It rises as an overflow of Lake Anneen about 40 kilometres southwest of Meekatharra, and flows in a northwesterly direction for about 102 kilometres before discharging into the Yalgar.

The river was named after James William Hope, owner with William Dalgety Moore, of Moorarie Station, one of the first stations taken up in the district. At that time the Hope was considered to run to a junction with the Murchison, the site of Moorarie Homestead. The last 40 kilometres to the Murchison junction is now considered to be part of the Yalgar River.
