= Eucalyptus infracorticata =

Scientific classification
- Kingdom: Plantae
- Clade: Tracheophytes
- Clade: Angiosperms
- Clade: Eudicots
- Clade: Rosids
- Order: Myrtales
- Family: Myrtaceae
- Genus: Eucalyptus
- Species: E. infracorticata

Binomial name
- Eucalyptus infracorticata L.A.S.Johnson & K.D.Hill

Species of eucalyptus

Eucalyptus infracorticata is a species of mallee that is endemic to a small area of Western Australia. It has rough, flaky or fibrous bark on the lower part of the trunk, broad lance-shaped adult leaves, flower buds in groups of between seven and eleven and short cylindrical fruit.

== Description ==
Eucalyptus infracorticata is a mallee. It has rough fibrous or flaky, pale grey bark on the base of the trunk. Adult leaves are dull green, broadly lance-shaped to elliptic, 60–110 mm (2.4–4.3 in) long and 15–25 mm (0.59–0.98 in) wide on a petiole 15–30 mm (0.59–1.18 in) long. The flower buds are arranged in leaf axils in groups of seven, nine or eleven on an unbranched peduncle 8–15 mm (0.31–0.59 in) long, the individual buds on pedicels 2–5 mm (0.079–0.197 in) long. Mature buds are pear-shaped, 9–10 mm (0.35–0.39 in) long and 5–6 mm (0.20–0.24 in) wide with a hemispherical operculum that is shorter than the floral cup. The fruit is a woody, cylindrical capsule 7–9 mm (0.28–0.35 in) long and 5–6 mm (0.20–0.24 in) wide with the valves near rim level.

== Taxonomy and naming ==
Eucalyptus infracorticata was first formally described in 2001 by Lawrie Johnson and Ken Hill from a specimen collected near Queen Victoria Spring near Cundeelee and the description was published in the journal Telopea. The specific epithet (infracortica) is from the Latin infra meaning "below" and corticatus meaning "covered with bark", referring to the rough bark on the base of the trunk.

The species is regarded as a synonym of Eucalyptus gypsophila by Dean Nicolle and is not listed at FloraBase.

== Distribution and habitat ==
This eucalypt grows in open mallee shrubland in sandy loam and is only known from the type location.

== See also ==
- List of Eucalyptus species
