= Heimdallia =

Trace fossil classification
- Kingdom: Animalia
- Phylum: Arthropoda
- Clade: Pancrustacea
- Class: incertae sedis
- Ichnogenus: †Heimdallia; Bradshaw, 1981
- Ichnospecies: †Heimdallia chatwini

Binomial name
- †Heimdallia chatwini Bradshaw, 1981

Trace fossil

Heimdallia is an ichnogenus comprising a strange planar trace that does not have a circular cross-section; its maker may have been fed upon by Beaconella.

The trace was probably made by a small crustacean.
