= Bilyuin Pool =

Tourist attraction in Western Australia

Coordinates: 25°54′20″S 118°39′44″E

Bilyuin Pool is a permanent pool located about 90 kilometres north of Meekatharra in central Western Australia, and the far upper reaches of the Murchison River. It is a popular camping ground, and, in the wet season when it is reasonably full, a popular swimming hole. The ruins of the Bilyuin Hotel are there.
