= Eucalyptus repullulans =

Chrysoprase mallee

Scientific classification
- Kingdom: Plantae
- Clade: Embryophytes
- Clade: Tracheophytes
- Clade: Spermatophytes
- Clade: Angiosperms
- Clade: Eudicots
- Clade: Rosids
- Order: Myrtales
- Family: Myrtaceae
- Genus: Eucalyptus
- Species: E. repullulans

Binomial name
- Eucalyptus repullulans D.Nicolle

Species of eucalyptus

Eucalyptus repullulans, commonly known as chrysoprase mallee, is a species of mallee that is native to arid parts of Western Australia and the far north-west of South Australia. It has smooth bark, lance-shaped adult leaves, flower buds in groups of between seven and thirteen, cream-coloured flowers and cup-shaped, cylindrical or conical fruit.

== Description ==
Eucalyptus repullulans is a slender-stemmed mallee that typically grows to a height of 3–6 m (9.8–19.7 ft) and forms a lignotuber. It has smooth pink and grey over cream bark that is shed in strips and ribbons. Young plants and coppice regrowth have glaucous, egg-shaped leaves that are 40–80 mm (1.6–3.1 in) long and 22–40 mm (0.87–1.57 in) wide and petiolate. Adult leaves are slightly waxy, the same shade of dull blue-green on both sides, narrow lance-shaped to lance-shaped, 62–135 mm (2.4–5.3 in) long and 10–28 mm (0.39–1.10 in) wide on a petiole 12–31 mm (0.47–1.22 in) long. The flower buds are arranged in leaf axils in groups of seven, nine, eleven or thirteen on an unbranched peduncle 6–20 mm (0.24–0.79 in) long, the individual buds on pedicels 3–5 mm (0.12–0.20 in) long. Mature buds are pear-shaped to cylindrical, sometimes glaucous, 8–12 mm (0.31–0.47 in) long and 5–6 mm (0.20–0.24 in) wide with a ribbed, conical to beaked operculum. Flowering has been recorded in May and the flowers are creamy white. The fruit is a woody, elongated cup-shaped, cylindrical or conical capsule with the valves near rim level. The seeds are a flattened oval shaped, reddish brown, about 3 mm (0.12 in) long and 1.5 mm (0.059 in) wide.

== Taxonomy ==
Eucalyptus repullulans was first formally described in 1997 by Dean Nicolle in the journal Nuytsia from material he collected from the summit of Mount Nameless near Tom Price in 1994. The specific epithet (repullulans) is a Latin word meaning "sprouting again", in reference to the mallee habit of this species.

This eucalypt belongs in subgenus Symphyomyrtus section Dumaria in a large sub-group, series Rufispermae, composed of 37 described species and subspecies including E. kondininensis, E. gypsophila and E. striaticalyx.

== Distribution ==
Chrysoprase mallee occurs in the Pilbara region of Western Australia and the central ranges of far north western South Australia where it is found on mountain and hills slopes and summits. It grows in rocky skeletal soils often among outcrops of chrysoprase.

== See also ==
- List of Eucalyptus species
