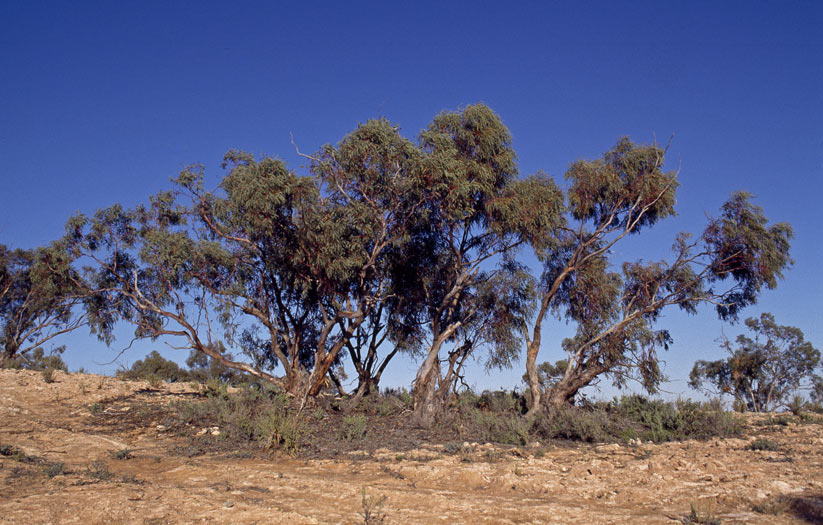
- Eucalyptus striaticalyx near Lake Annean

Scientific classification
- Kingdom: Plantae
- Clade: Embryophytes
- Clade: Tracheophytes
- Clade: Spermatophytes
- Clade: Angiosperms
- Clade: Eudicots
- Clade: Rosids
- Order: Myrtales
- Family: Myrtaceae
- Genus: Eucalyptus
- Species: E. striaticalyx

Binomial name
- Eucalyptus striaticalyx W.Fitzg.

= Eucalyptus striaticalyx =

Cue York gum

Species of eucalyptus

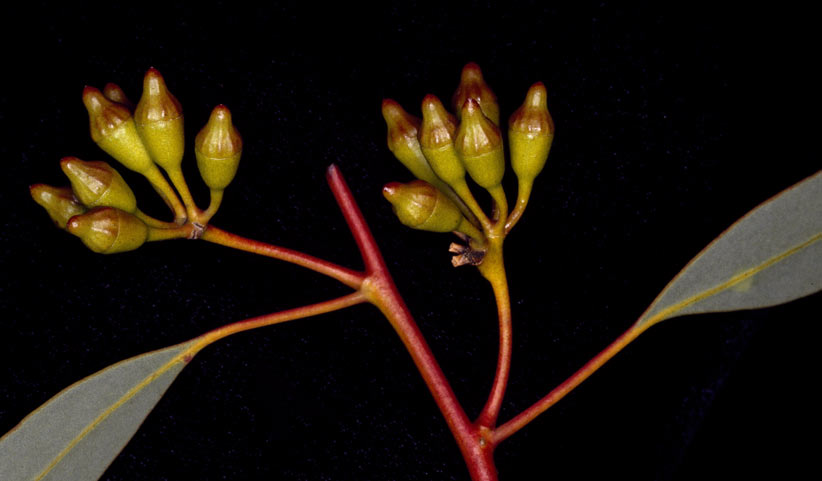
Flower buds

Eucalyptus striaticalyx, commonly known as Cue York gum or kopi gum, is a species of tree or mallee that is endemic to Western Australia. It has thick, rough, fibrous bark on the trunk and larger branches, lance-shaped adult leaves, flower buds in groups of between seven and thirteen, creamy white flowers and conical to cup-shaped fruit.

== Description ==
Eucalyptus striaticalyx is a tree or a mallee that typically grows to a height of 5–12 m (16–39 ft). It has persistent thick, rough fibrous, dark greyish bark over most of the trunk, smooth and creamy brown to pinkish bark above. Young plants have bluish green, egg-shaped to broadly lance-shaped leaves that are 55–110 mm (2.2–4.3 in) long and 25–40 mm (0.98–1.57 in) wide. Adult leaves are the same shade of dull grey-green to blue-green on both sides, lance-shaped, 70–175 mm (2.8–6.9 in) long and 7–25 mm (0.28–0.98 in) wide, the base tapering to a petiole 13–30 mm (0.51–1.18 in) long. The flower buds are arranged in leaf axils in groups of between seven and thirteen on an unbranched peduncle 5–15 mm (0.20–0.59 in) long, the individual buds on pedicels 3–8 mm (0.12–0.31 in) long. Mature buds are oval, 8–13 mm (0.31–0.51 in) long and 4–7 mm (0.16–0.28 in) wide with a beaked operculum about the same length as the floral cup. Flowering occurs in most months and the flowers are creamy white.

== Taxonomy ==
Eucalyptus striaticalyx was first formally described in 1904 by the botanist William Vincent Fitzgerald in the Journal of the West Australian Natural History Society. The specific epithet is taken from the Latin words striatus meaning "striated" and calyx, in reference to the operculum.

In 1997, Dean Nicolle described two subspecies of E. striaticalyx and the names have been accepted by the Australian Plant Census:

- Eucalyptus striaticalyx subsp. delicata D.Nicolle, distinguished by its depauperate habit, narrower leaves, smaller flower buds and fruit than the autonym;
- Eucalyptus striaticalyx W.Fitzg. subsp. striaticalyx.

The tree belongs in subgenus Symphyomyrtus section Dumaria to a large sub-group, series Rufispermae, composed of 37 described species and subspecies including E. kondininensis, E. gypsophila and E. repullulans.

== Distribution ==
Cue York gum is found on dunes near salt lakes, low hills and drainage lines and has a scattered distribution throughout the northern Goldfields-Esperance region of Western Australia from near Meekatharra to near Kalgoorlie, where it grows in powdery loam soils. Subspecies delicata has a more restricted distribution around Lake Annean and Lake Austin.

== Conservation status ==
This eucalypt is classified as "not threatened" by the Western Australian Government Department of Parks and Wildlife.

== See also ==
- List of Eucalyptus species
