= Moorarie Station =

Pastoral lease in Western Australia

Coordinates: 25.9221°S 117.6001°E

Location in Western Australia

Moorarie Station is a pastoral lease currently operating as a sheep station in the Murchison district of Western Australia's Mid West region.

The property is situated approximately 117 kilometres (73 mi) northwest of Meekatharra and 400 kilometres (249 mi) east of Carnarvon. It is watered by the southern branch of the Murchison River, the Hope River and the Yalgar River.

== History ==
Moorarie was established by Edward William Butcher in 1875. Two years later Butcher sold the station to Dr James William Hope and his future father-in-law John Henry Monger. Hope operated the station with a sequence of partners, initially Alexander Crawford, later William Dalgety Moore, until 1891.

In 1886 the property occupied an area of 1,100,000 acres (445,154 ha), watered by two major rivers, several clay pans and numerous shallow wells. At the time there were 14,000 sheep, 250 cattle and 40 horses, with Aboriginal labour for shepherding, shearing and mustering.

William Kerr owned Moorarie from at least 1907 and held it until his death in 1936.

== Floods ==
In 1884 the Murchison flooded out to a distance of 6 miles (10 km) from the river bank and the main homestead was washed away with about 3,000 ewes and lambs.

In April 1800 the Ord River was twelve miles wide near Moorarie, and the Murchison River was six miles wide in places.

In March 1926 the property was isolated for a week by floods. One shepherd spent five days stuck up a tree before being rescued by a passerby who swam his horse two miles to reach him. At least 400 sheep were lost to floodwaters but workers saved another 400 by swimming them to higher ground over a period of two days.

== See also ==
- List of ranches and stations
