= Impey River =

River in Western Australia

Coordinates: 26°48′21″S 116°16′25″E

Location
- Country: Australia

Physical characteristics
- Source
  - location: South of Mount Murchison
  - elevation: 317 metres (1,040 ft)
- Mouth
  - location: Minnawarra Crossing Murchison River
  - elevation: 290 metres (951 ft)
- Length: 24 km (15 mi)

The Impey River is a river in the Mid West region of Western Australia. It rises south of Mount Murchison and flows east-north-east until it merges with the Murchison River, of which it is a tributary.

The first recorded sighting of the river was by surveyor Robert Austin during an expedition in 1857. In 1858 the river was named by explorer Francis Gregory after the prominent geologist, Sir Roderick Impey Murchison.
