= Yalgar River =

River in Western Australia

Coordinates: 25°56′S 117°34′E

Location
- Country: Australia

Physical characteristics
- Source
  - location: Glengarry Range
  - elevation: 609 m (1,998 ft)
- Mouth
  - location: Murchison River
  - elevation: 391 m (1,283 ft)
- Length: 185 kilometres (115 mi)

Basin features
- Tributaries
  - left: Glengarry Creek, Hope River

The Yalgar River is a 185-kilometre-long tributary of the Murchison River, located in the Shire of Meekatharra in central Western Australia. It rises in the Glengarry Range 25 km southeast of Mooloogool Station homestead, about 80 kilometres northeast of Meekatharra, flowing 145 kilometres westward (crossing the Great Northern Highway at Karralundi) to a junction with the Hope River. From there it flows north-northwesterly for about 40 kilometres, emptying into the upper reaches of the Murchison River, near Moorarie Station homestead on the Carnarvon-Meekatharra Road.

Originally called Ord Creek, the river was named after Yalgar Pool on the Hope River, a watering point on the Cue-Ashburton Stock Route.
