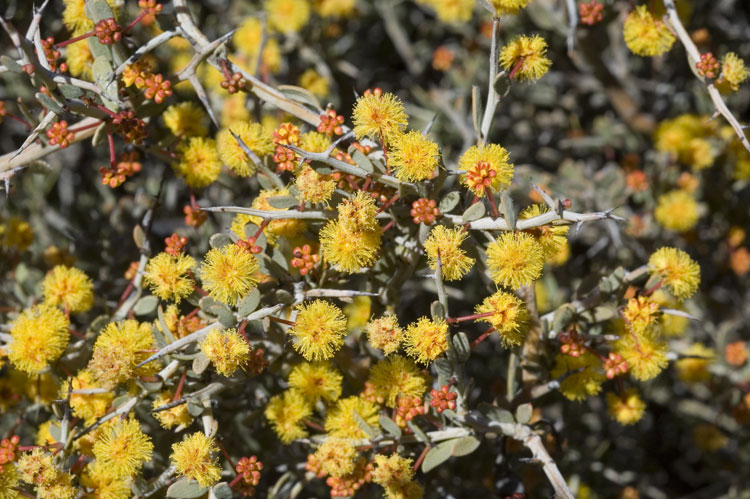

Scientific classification
- Kingdom: Plantae
- Clade: Tracheophytes
- Clade: Angiosperms
- Clade: Eudicots
- Clade: Rosids
- Order: Fabales
- Family: Fabaceae
- Subfamily: Caesalpinioideae
- Clade: Mimosoid clade
- Genus: Acacia
- Species: A. erinacea

Binomial name
- Acacia erinacea Benth.
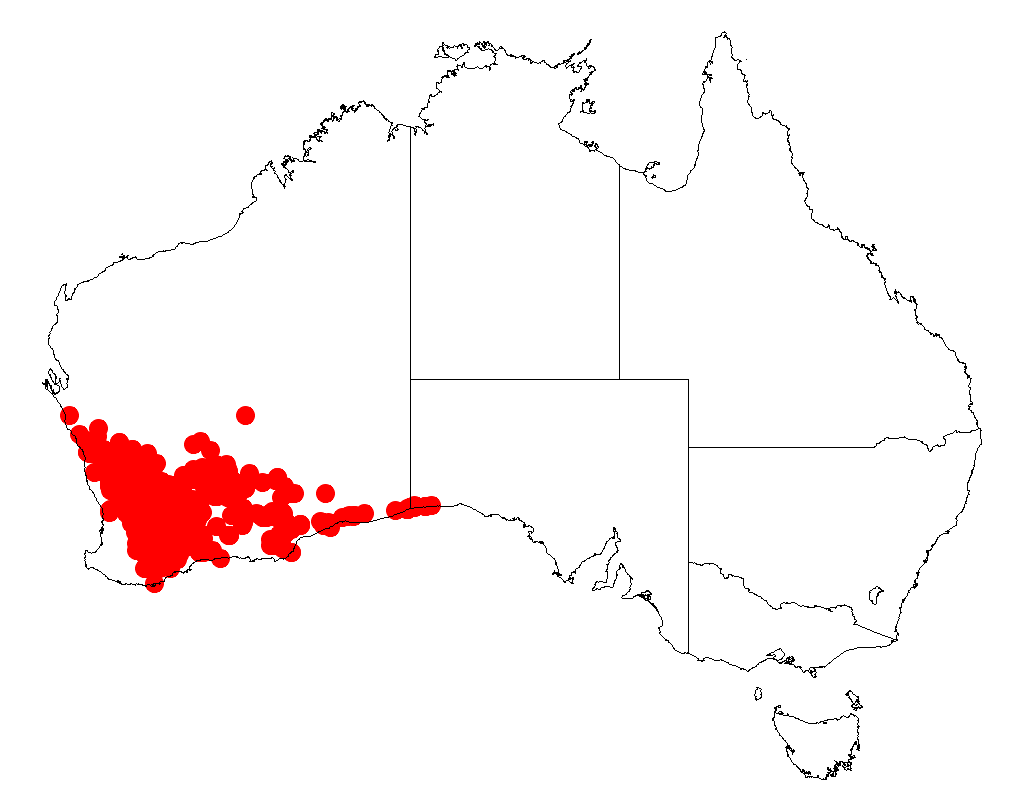
- Occurrence data from AVH

Synonyms
- Acacia erinacea Benth. var. erinacea; Acacia erinacea var. microphylla E.Pritz.; Racosperma erinaceum (Benth.) Pedley

= Acacia erinacea =

Species of legume

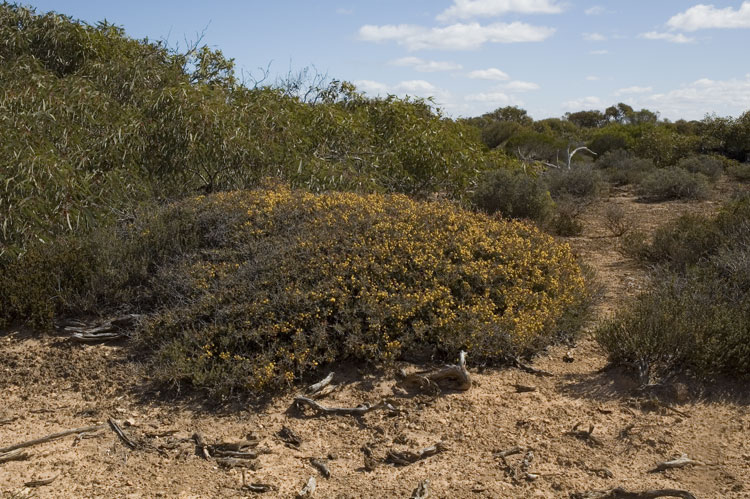
Habit near the Eyre Highway, South Australia

Acacia erinacea is a species of flowering plant in the family Fabaceae and is endemic to the south-west of Australia. It is a rigid, intricate, prickly, spreading shrub with short, widely-spreading, whitish, spiny branchlets, ascending to erect, oblong phyllodes, spherical heads of golden yellow flowers and oblong pods.

== Description ==
Acacia erinacea is a rigid, intricate, prickly, spreading shrub that typically grows to 0.3–1 m (1 ft 0 in – 3 ft 3 in) high, sometimes forming prostrate mats or reaching up to 2 m (6 ft 7 in) high. It has short, widely branching finely ribbed, spiny branchlets that often have no leaves. The new shoots are red to red-brown. The phyllodes are mostly ascending to erect and oblong, 5–12 mm (0.20–0.47 in) long, 2–4 mm (0.079–0.157 in) wide, grey-green to glaucous, sometimes whitish with an obscure midrib. The flowers are borne in a spherical head in axils in a raceme more than 0.5 mm (0.020 in) long on a red to reddish-brown peduncle 4–12 mm (0.16–0.47 in) long, each head with 12 to 22 golden yellow flowers. Flowering occurs from June to November and the pods are oblong to narrowly oblong, slightly biconvex, straight, usually 10–30 mm (0.39–1.18 in) long and 7–10 mm (0.28–0.39 in) wide and crusty without internal divisions. The seeds are oblong to widely elliptic, 3.5–4.0 mm (0.14–0.16 in) long, one side often flattened, shiny dark brown with an aril near the end.

== Taxonomy ==
Acacia erinacea was first formally described in 1842 by George Bentham in the London Journal of Botany from specimens collected by James Drummond in the Swan River Colony. The specific epithet (erinacea) means 'hedgehog' (used as an adjective), referring to the spiny habit.

== Distribution and habitat ==
This species of wattle is widespread from Kalbarri National Park, south to Broomehill and east to Eucla in the Avon Wheatbelt, Coolgardie, Esperance Plains, Geraldton Sandplains, Hampton, Jarrah Forest, Mallee, Murchison, Nullarbor, Swan Coastal Plain and Yalgoo bioregions of South-western Western Australia. It also occurs just into the extreme south-west of South Australia. In grows in a variety of soils, often on clay, in woodland, mallee woodland and sandplain scrub, on hills and flats.

== Conservation status ==
Acacia erinacea is listed as "not threatened" by the Government of Western Australia Department of Biodiversity, Conservation and Attractions.

== See also ==
- List of Acacia species
