= Lake Anneen =

Lake in Western Australia

Lake Annean
- Annean Lake: Nannine Lake
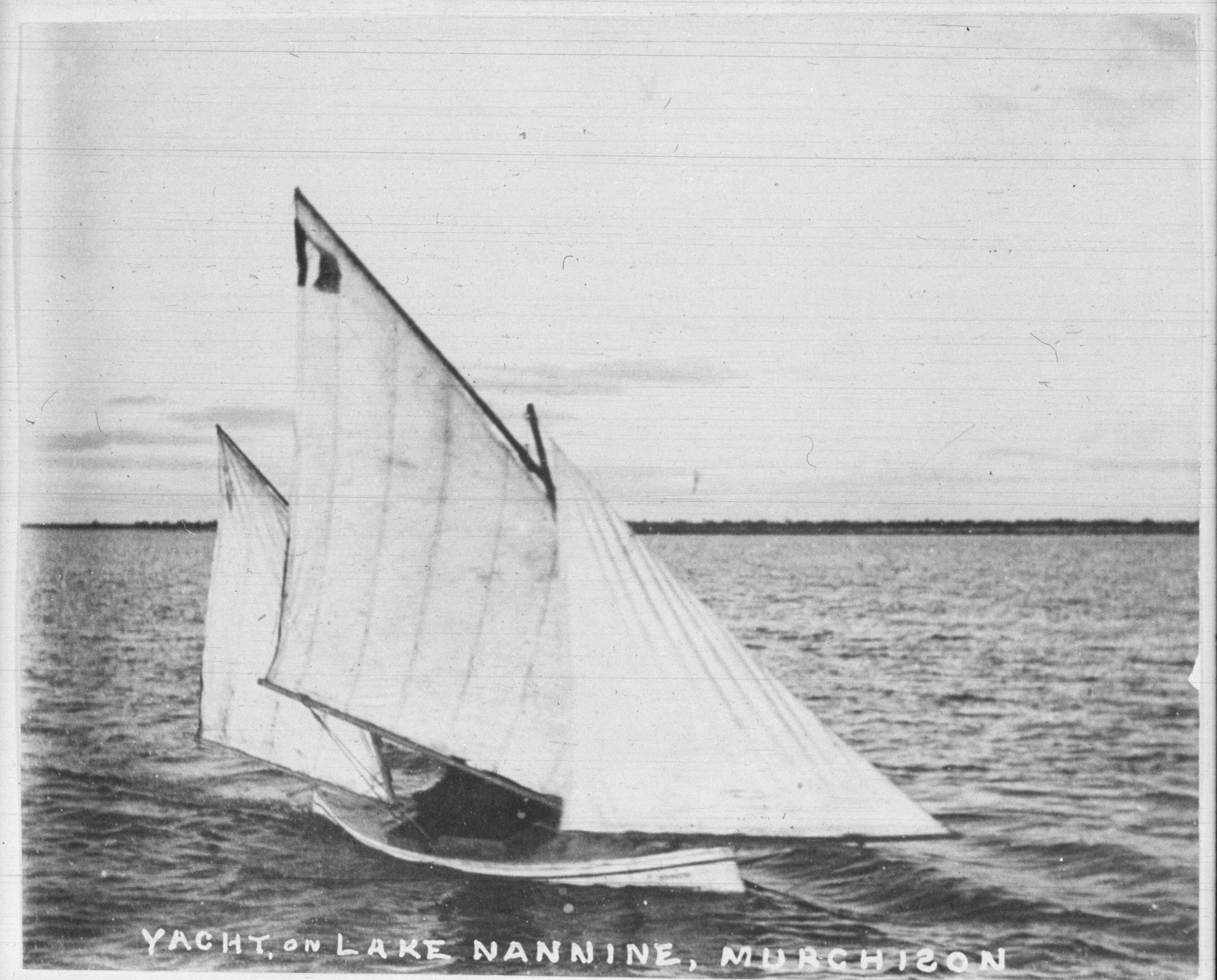
- Yachting on Lake Annean, c. 1905

- Location in Western Australia
- Interactive map of Lake Annean
- Location: Western Australia
- Coordinates: 26°56′S 118°18′E
- Type: Salt lake
- Basin countries: Australia
- Surface area: 120 km^{2} (46 sq mi)

Lake Annean, sometimes referred to as Annean Lake or incorrectly as Nannine Lake, is a DIWA-listed salt lake system in the Mid West region of Western Australia. The lake is situated about 40 kilometres (25 mi) southwest of Meekatharra.

== Description ==
The lake is roughly 120 square kilometres (46 sq mi) in area, and consists of a main waterbody with two elongate arms. The main waterbody is roughly rectangular, with its long side oriented along a north-westerly axis. A narrow arm, essentially a network of anastomosing creeks, arises from near the eastern edge, stretching north almost to Meekatharra; the lake receives inflow from this arm and also some smaller creeks on the west and north side. Drainage is via the other arm, which arises from near the western edge and reaches almost to headwaters of the Hope River, into which Lake Anneen flows following heavy rains. A low ridge nearly divides the lake roughly in two, and the Great Northern Highway now runs along this ridge.

Lake Annean is shallow, with a great many islands and peninsulas. Some parts of the lake almost always hold water, but the entire lake fills only after flooding caused by tropical summer and autumn rains. This occurs only every five to ten years.

It is one of the most important breeding sites in Western Australia for Gelochelidon nilotica (gull-billed tern) and Chlidonias hybridus (whiskered tern). It is also an important refuge for other waterbirds, the nearest adjacent wetland, Wooleen Lake, being nearly 200 kilometres (124 mi) away.

The ghost town of Nannine is located on the northern banks of Lake Annean. The lake is no longer currently subject to any human use, except for some recreational windsurfing by residents of the area. Potential degrading processes include pastoral grazing, grazing and predation by feral and introduced animals, the illicit picking of wildflowers, and pollution by the highway or nearby gold mines.

== See also ==
- List of lakes of Australia § Western Australia
