= Eucalyptus gypsophila =

Kopi mallee

Scientific classification
- Kingdom: Plantae
- Clade: Tracheophytes
- Clade: Angiosperms
- Clade: Eudicots
- Clade: Rosids
- Order: Myrtales
- Family: Myrtaceae
- Genus: Eucalyptus
- Species: E. gypsophila

Binomial name
- Eucalyptus gypsophila D.Nicolle

Species of plant endemic to Australia

Eucalyptus gypsophila, also known as the kopi mallee, is a species of mallee that is native to Western Australia and South Australia. It has rough, flaky bark on the lower part of the trunk, smooth light grey bark above, lance-shaped adult leaves, flower buds mostly in groups of between seven and eleven, creamy white flowers and conical to cylindrical fruit.

== Description ==
Eucalyptus gypsophila is a mallee that typically grows to a height of 3 to 6 metres (10 to 20 ft) and has persistent rough bark toward the base of the trunk, smooth light grey over pinkish grey to coppery cream coloured bark above. Young plants and coppice regrowth have slightly glaucous, egg-shaped to more or less round leaves that are 30–55 mm (1.2–2.2 in) long and 25–45 mm (0.98–1.77 in) wide. Adult leaves are arranged alternately, the same dull blue-grey to grey-green on both sides, lance-shaped, 90–130 mm (3.5–5.1 in) long and 18–25 mm (0.71–0.98 in)) wide with the base tapering to a petiole 10–25 mm (0.39–0.98 in) long. The flower buds are arranged in leaf axils, usually in groups of seven, nine or eleven on a peduncle 5–20 mm (0.20–0.79 in) long, the individual buds on pedicels 2–6 mm (0.079–0.236 in) long. Mature buds are oval, 8–14 mm (0.31–0.55 in) long and 5–9 mm (0.20–0.35 in) wide with a conical to rounded operculum that has radiating striations. Flowering occurs between July and December and the flowers are creamy white. The fruit is a woody, conical to cylindrical capsule 7–12 mm (0.28–0.47 in) long and 7–11 mm (0.28–0.43 in) wide with the valves near rim level.

== Taxonomy and naming ==
Eucalyptus gypsophila was first formally described in 1997 by the botanist Dean Nicolle in the journal Nuytsia. The specific epithet (gypsophila) is from the Greek gypsos meaning 'gypsum' and philos, 'loving', referring to this species commonly occurring on gypsum sand dunes around dry lakes.

This species was previously included in E. striaticalyx but that species is a tree.

Eucalyptus infracorticata is listed as a synonym of E. gypsophila at Plants of the World Online, but is an accepted species at the Australian Plant Census.

This mallee belongs in subgenus Symphyomyrtus section Dumaria, to a large sub-group, series Rufispermae, composed of 37 described species and subspecies including E. kondininensis, E. striaticalyx and E. repullulans.

== Distribution ==
Kopi mallee is widespread in the Great Victoria Desert, from east of Laverton in Western Australia to the western edge of the Gawler Ranges in South Australia. Over most of its range it grows on red sand over limestone, often near salt lakes or dry lakes.

== See also ==
- List of Eucalyptus species
