= Beaconella =

Beaconella Temporal range: Anisian

Trace fossil classification
- Domain: Eukaryota
- Kingdom: Animalia
- Phylum: Arthropoda
- Class: Insecta
- Order: incertae sedis
- Ichnogenus: †Beaconella

Trace fossil

Beaconella is an ichnogenus comprising a wide trace thought to be constructed by a burrowing arthropod ploughing through the sediment for food, leaving a mound of piled sediment at the end of each trace.

== See also ==
- Beaconites
