= Robinson Ranges =

Range of hills in Western Australia

Coordinates: 25°45′S 119°00′E

The Robinson Ranges are a range of hills approximately 120 kilometres (75 mi) north of Meekatharra in central Western Australia. The range is a unique physiographic feature located within the upper section of the Padbury group sequence in the Palaeoproterozoic basin. Robinson Range is situated on the boundary between the younger Gascoyne province to the north and the older Yilgarn block to the south.

It forms the boundary between the upper catchments of the Murchison and Gascoyne Rivers. The former arises from the southern slopes, flowing around 780 kilometres west to the Indian Ocean.

Iron ore and manganese tenements exist close to the range and are held under native title by the traditional owners, the Nharnuwangga Wajarri and Ngarlawangga peoples. The mining company involved, Midwest Corporation, expect to begin advanced exploration in 2009 following a heritage agreement being completed in 2008. The Palaeoproterozoic formation contains a high amount of hematite and goethite minerals that were first discovered in the 1970s.
