= Murchison River (Western Australia) =

River in Western Australia

Coordinates: 27°42′27″S 114°9′36″E

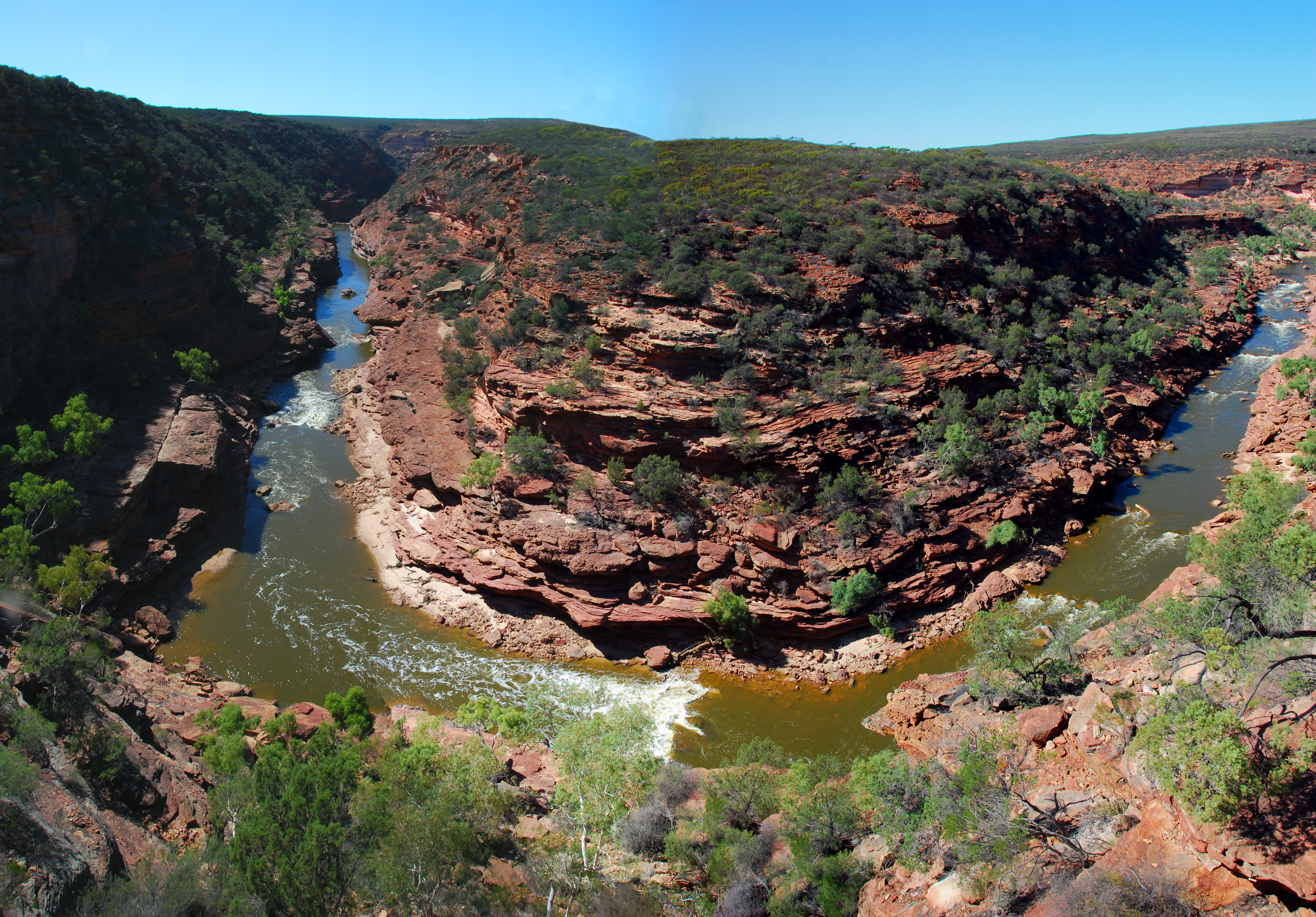
- View of Murchison Gorge from the Z Bend lookout

Location
- Country: Australia

Physical characteristics
- Source
  - location: Robinson Ranges
  - elevation: 521 m (1,709 ft)
- Mouth
  - location: Indian Ocean, at Kalbarri
- Length: 820 km (510 mi)
- Basin size: 82,000 km^{2} (32,000 sq mi)
- Discharge
  - average: 208,400 ML/a (6.60 m^{3}/s; 233.2 cu ft/s)

Basin features
- Tributaries
  - left: Yalgar River, Whela Creek, Impey River, Roderick River, Sanford River, Yalgamine Creek
  - right: Bedaburra Creek

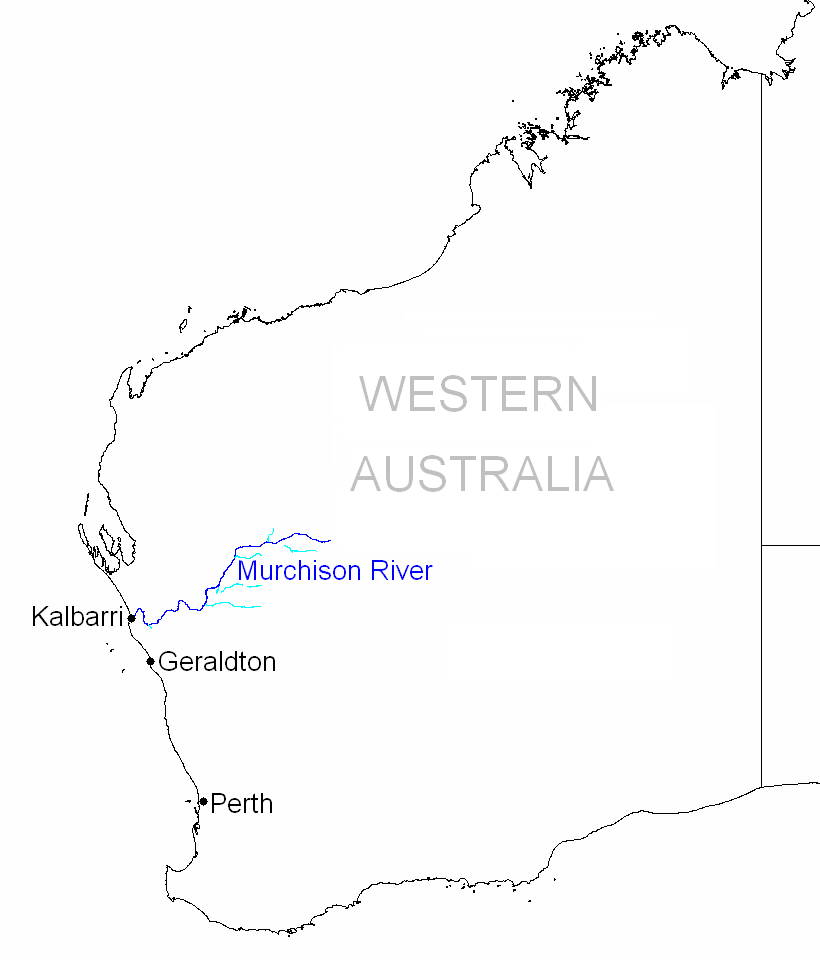
Location of the Murchison River

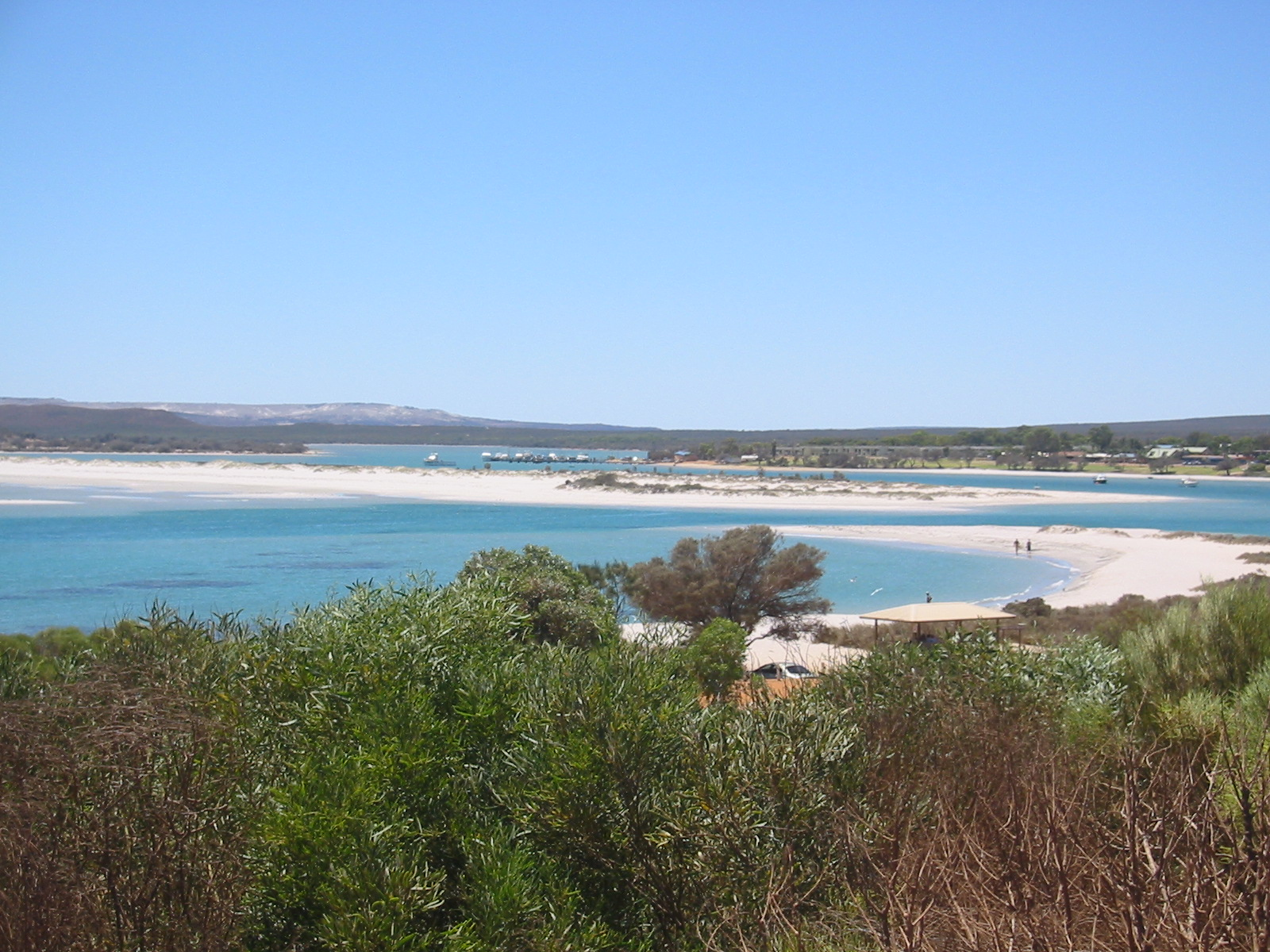
Murchison River mouth

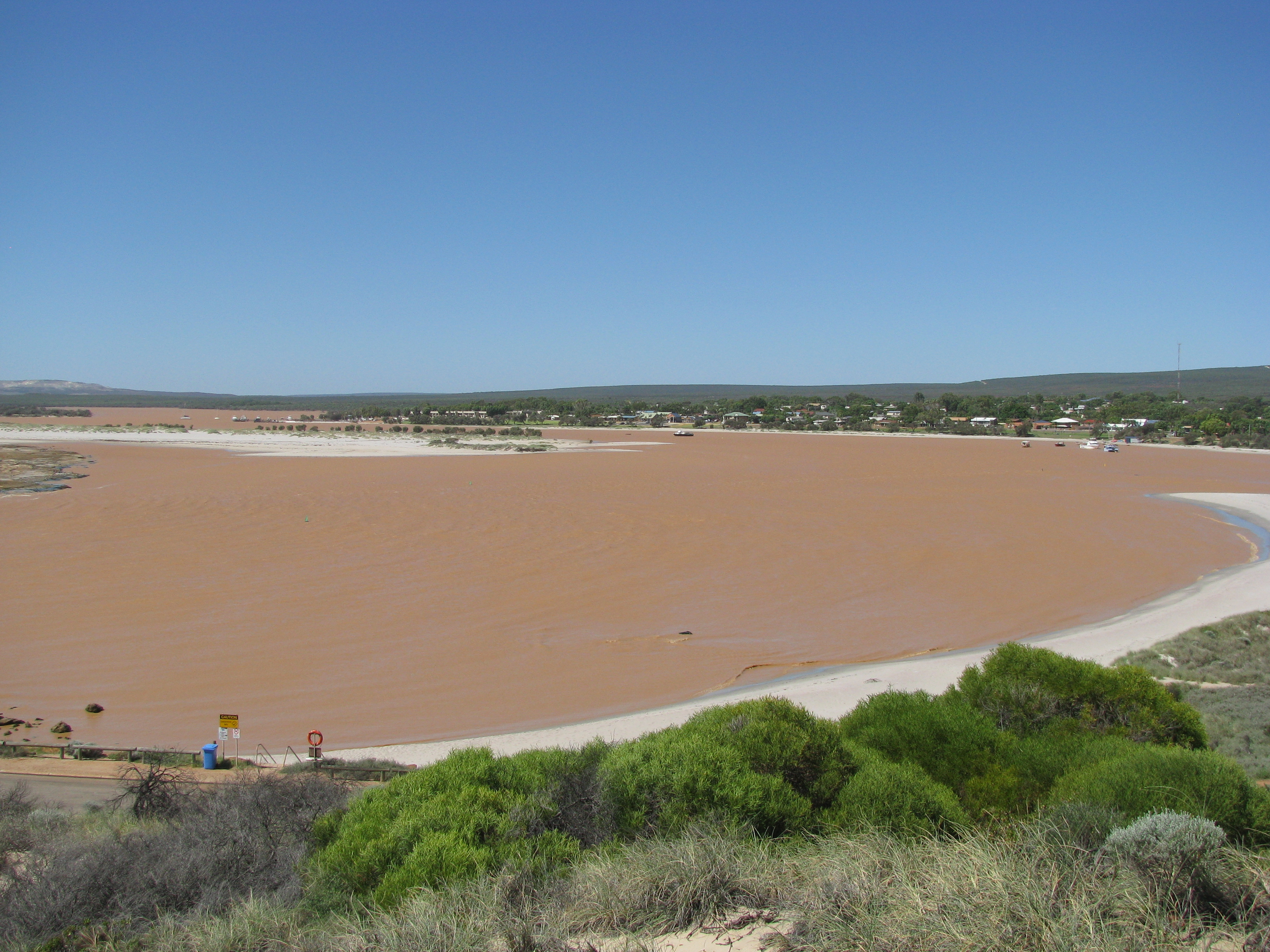
Murchison River at Kalbarri after heavy rains

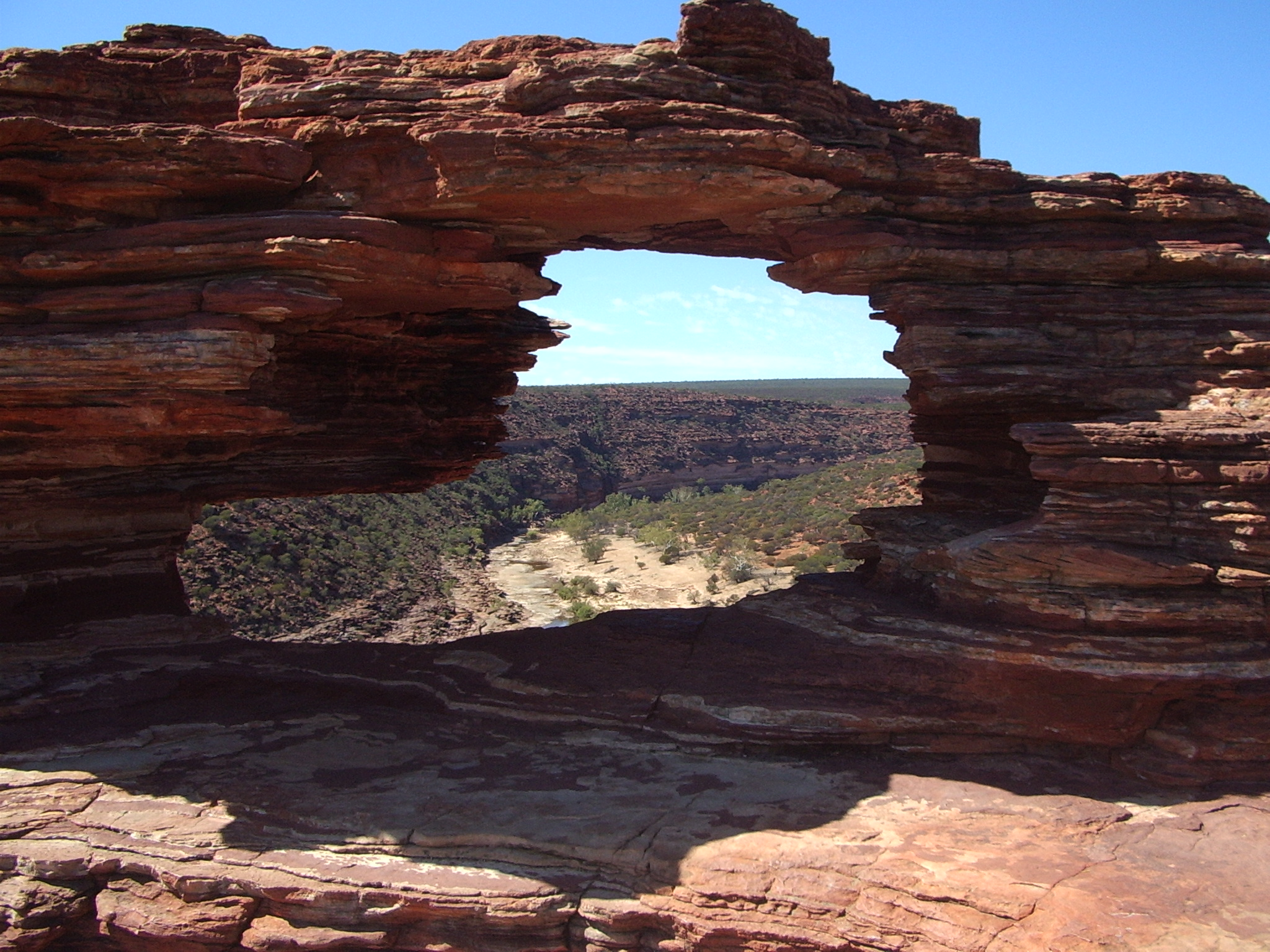
Murchison River through Nature's Window

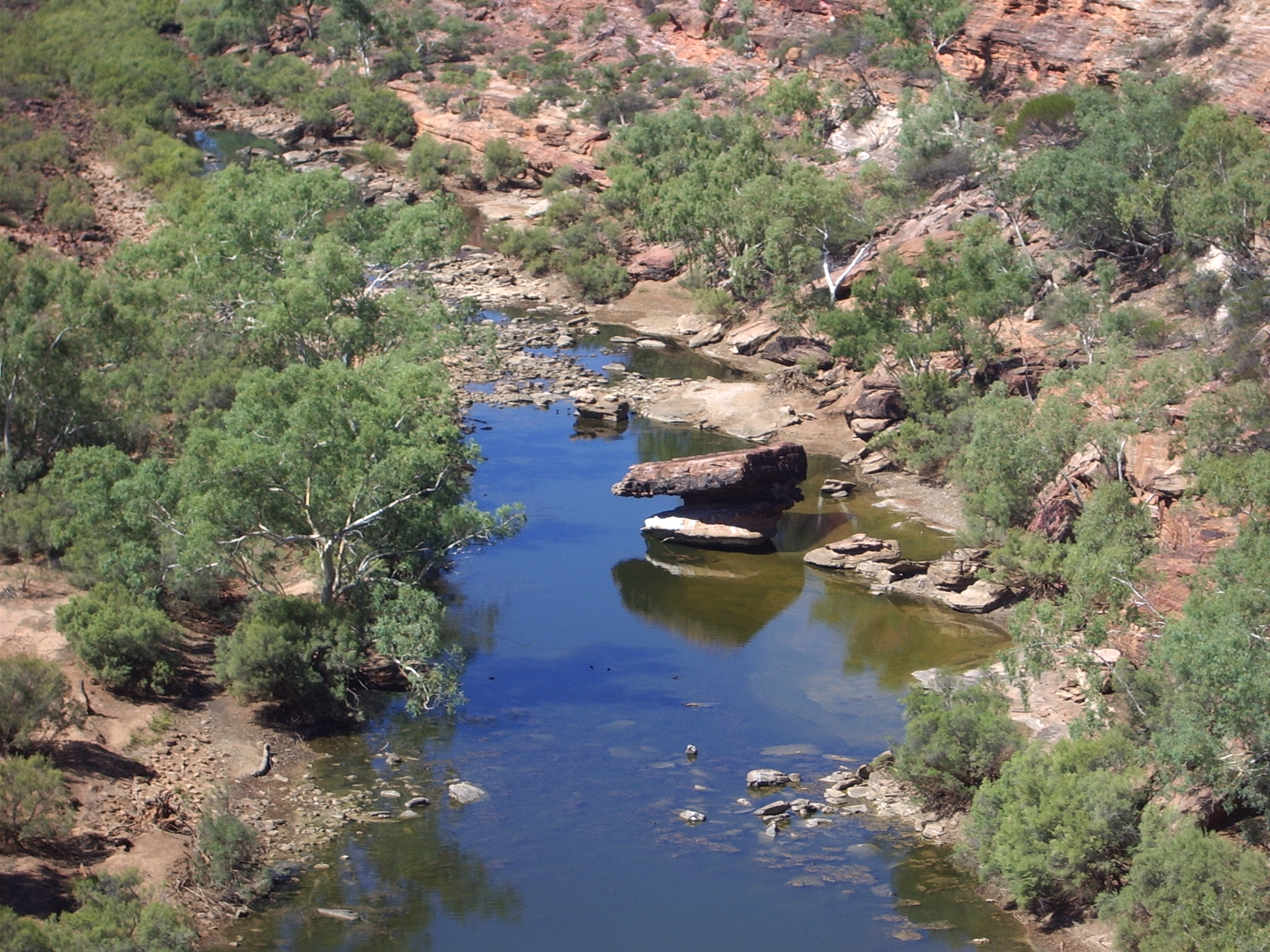
Murchison River from Hawk's Nest

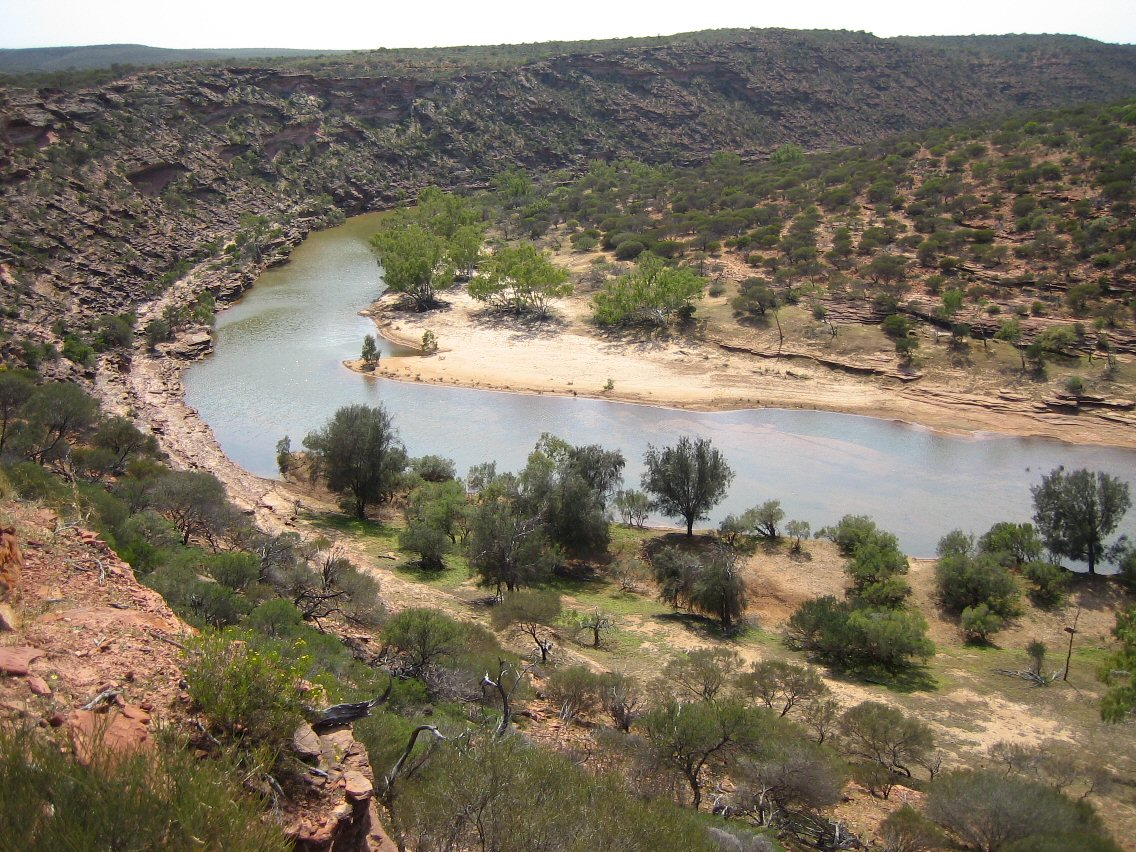
Murchison River

The Murchison River is the second longest river in Western Australia. It flows for about 820 km (510 mi) from the southern edge of the Robinson Ranges to the Indian Ocean at Kalbarri. The Murchison-Yalgar-Hope river system is the longest river system in Western Australia. It has a mean annual flow of 208 gigalitres, although in 2006, the peak year on record since 1967, flow was 1,806 gigalitres.

== Basin ==
The Murchison River basin covers an area of about 82,000 square kilometres (31,660 sq mi) in the Mid West region of Western Australia. It extends about 550 km (340 mi) inland from the Indian Ocean, onto the Yilgarn craton east of Meekatharra and north of Sandstone. Rain generally falls in the upper basin during summer cyclones, so for much of the year the Murchison River does not flow, leaving a dry sandy river bed and intermittent permanent pools.

The eastern reaches of the basin contain large chains of salt lakes, which flow only following rainfall. The drainage lines from these lakes merge to form the Murchison River about 90 km (56 mi) north-northeast of Meekatharra. The river flows west, southwest, and west to the Indian Ocean.

Within the basin are the towns of Kalbarri and Meekatharra; the hamlets of Ajana, Binnu, Barrel Well and Murchison; and the mining ghost towns of Galena, Geraldine, Abbotts, Chesterfield, Peak Hill, Yaloginda, Reedy, Nannine, Quinns, Burnakura and Gabanintha.

== Course ==
The Murchison River rises on the southern slopes of the Robinson Ranges, about 75 km (47 mi) north of Meekatharra in central Western Australia. From there it flows in a westerly direction for about 130 km (81 mi) to its junction with its largest tributary, the Yalgar River, then west for another 100 km (62 mi) before turning south-southwest for 120 km (75 mi), at which point it is joined by the Roderick River, about 30 km (19 mi) east of Murchison Settlement. Another 70 km (43 mi) to the south-southwest it joins another important tributary, the Sanford River. Over the next 100 km (62 mi) it makes a number of sharp turns, taking it about 70 km (43 mi) to the west. It then flows to the southwest, flowing under the North West Coastal Highway at the Galena Bridge. Entering the Kalbarri National Park, it flows first to the northwest and then to the north, flowing through the Murchison Gorge, and passing through a number of tight bends known as the Z Bend and The Loop respectively. It eventually turns to the southwest, passing through one more dogleg before discharging into the Indian Ocean at Kalbarri, the only town on the river.

=== Murchison Gorge ===
Murchison Gorge is a deep gorge in near pristine condition. It is popular with tourists, and there are a number of tourist lookouts. It is also of geological interest, as it exposes a section through the Tumblagooda Sandstone, a geological sequence rich in Ordovician trace fossils. The maximum age for initiating major down-cutting of the Murchison Gorge, in response to regional Quaternary tectonism, is Late Eocene (33.9–38 million years ago).

=== Estuary ===
The final 18 kilometres (11 mi) of the Murchison River, from the Murchison House ford to the mouth, are estuarine, and consist of a sequence of long sandbars and shallow pools mostly less than a metre deep. The estuary is permanently open to the sea, so is constantly affected by tides and the inflow of saline sea water. When river flow is low, the estuary accumulates sediment from the ocean, narrowing the river channel; this sediment is evacuated to the ocean during periods of high flow, but high flow also brings sediment into the estuary from upriver. Because of the high sediment load, and continual stirring by wind and river flow, the water is turbid.

The mouth of the estuary is a small delta, closed by a sandbar except for a narrow channel. Although this channel is permanently open, it is usually very narrow and shallow, and so is now dredged every year to allow passage by western rock lobster fishing boats.

== History ==
The Murchison River was named by the explorer George Grey, whose boats were wrecked at its mouth on 1 April 1839, during his second disastrous exploratory expedition; the name honours Grey's patron, the Scottish geologist Sir Roderick Murchison. Murchison's advocacy had been essential in securing official support for Grey's Western Australian expeditions.

Murchison House Station, one of the oldest stations in Western Australia, was established by Charles Von Bibra on the banks of the river toward the western end in 1858.

The estuary and river mouth was used as a holiday destination by families from the Galena mines in the 1920s and 1930s, and a military holiday camp was built there during World War II.

In 1951 the town of Kalbarri was gazetted at the river mouth, and by the end of the 1990s the population was about 2,000. In 1963 the Kalbarri National Park was gazetted, formally protecting the lower reaches of the river, including the gorge.

The Galena Bridge, carrying North West Coastal Highway over the river at Galena, was opened by the Main Roads Department in December 1983.

== Flooding ==
Flooding occurred in 1866 resulting in the Geraldine Mine being drowned; more flooding occurred in 1882.

The southern branch flooded out to a distance of 6 miles (10 km) from the river bank in 1884 and the main homestead at Moorarie Station was washed away with about 3,000 ewes and lambs.

The river was once again flooded in 1900 following heavy rains with the river estimated to be running 8 miles (13 km) wide, road to Cue and Peak Hill were submerged under 10 feet (3 m) of water. Roads were cut for up to a fortnight resulting in food shortages in many isolated towns. Ernest Lee Steere of Belele Station reported that over 5 inches (130 mm) of rain fell in less than a fortnight. Further downstream the river was reported to be running 15 miles (24 km) wide and at depths of up to 70 feet (21 m); despite the damage, pastoralists were jubilant at how quickly the grasses were growing.

Heavy flooding occurred along the course of the river in March 1926 following heavy rains upstream. 15 to 20 men were stranded at the Three Sisters Mine on the north side of the river, at Galena, and were rescued by dinghy.

Flooding again occurred in 1939 and 1942, and once more following another significant rain event in February 1945 that resulted in flooding and the old Galena Bridge being swept away, effectively stranding the citizens of Carnarvon. A ferry service was established using a fishing boat. Bananas were the main item that urgently needed to be sent across for transport to market.

Following Cyclone Emma in 2006, much of the catchment area received 100 millimetres (4 in) of rainfall. The river swelled, reaching a width of over 20 kilometres (12 mi) in places, and Kalbarri had to be sandbagged to protect it from floodwaters.

== See also ==
- Bilyuin Pool
- Pencell Pool
- Wooleen Station
