= List of Acacia species known to contain psychoactive alkaloids =

This article is a list of Acacia species (sensu lato) that are known to contain psychoactive alkaloids, or are suspected of containing such alkaloids due to being psychoactive. The presence and constitution of alkaloids in nature can be highly variable, due to environmental and genetic factors.

== Acacias known to contain psychoactive alkaloids ==
Acacias Known to Contain Psychoactive Alkaloids
Acacia acinacea	0.04-0.82% alkaloids in leaves and stems, 0.08% in ripe pods, mostly phenethylamine
Acacia acuminata ssp. acuminata	DMT in bark (up to 1.6%) and in leaves (0.6-1.0%), young leaves mainly containing tryptamine; 0.72% alkaloids from leaves and stems, mostly tryptamine
Acacia burkittii (syn. A. burkittii)	DMT in bark (0.2-1.2%), 0.1% alkaloids from leaves (mostly NMT); 1.5% alkaloids from leaves and stems, mostly tryptamine
Acacia adunca	β-methyl-phenethylamine (N-methyl-phenethylamine), 2.4% in leaves; 3.2% alkaloids in aerial parts (stems, leaves, flowers) - about 70% was β-methyl-phenethylamine, with smaller amounts of phenethylamine
Acacia albida	Published reports of DMT in the leaf derive from a misreading of a paper that found no DMT in leaves of this species. Besides this, there are independent claims of DMT in leaves and bark based on human bioassay, and traces of 5-MeO-DMT, DMT and NMT were tentatively identified by TLC in twigs. Root bark contains alkaloids that were not identified
Acacia alpina	Dimethyltryptamine active levels in leaf
Acacia aneura	Ash used in Pituri. Ether extracts about 2-6% of the dried leaf mass. Not known if psychoactive per se.
Acacia angustissima	0.028% β-methyl-phenethylamine in leaves, DMT (0.00012-0.00102%) and N-methyltyramine (0.00011-0.005%) in leaves; DMT and 5-MeO-DMT tentatively identified by TLC from roots in one test, not detected in follow up; 5-MeO-DMT tentatively identified by TLC in seeds
Acacia aroma	Has been claimed to contain tryptamine alkaloids and significant amount of tryptamine in the seeds, but this needs confirmation and supporting information
Acacia auriculiformis	5-MeO-DMT tentatively identified in stem bark
Acacia baileyana	0.02% alkaloids in spring (80% tetrahydroharman, 20% tryptamine), 0.028% autumn (tryptamine) and none in summer, with leaves of Californian plants; traces of DMT and unidentified indoles tentatively detected in seeds
Acacia beauverdiana	Claimed to be psychoactive, but supporting information is needed. Ash used in pituri
Acacia berlandieri	Hordenine, tyramine and N-methyltyramine in leaves; 0.28-0.66% N-methylphenethylamine in leaves. Causes stock intoxications in Texas. Claims of amphetamines, mescaline, nicotine and many other alkaloids are suspect
Acacia buxifolia	0.65% alkaloids from leaves and stems, 0.58% from pods and 0.09% from seeds, mostly phenethylamine
Acacia caesia	Tryptamine and DMT N-oxide from bark
Acacia cardiophylla	0.02-0.06% alkaloids from stems and leaves, consisting of tryptamine and phenethylamine; one screening found no alkaloids
Acacia catechu (syn. A. polyacantha, A. suma)	Claims of DMT in the plant have been referenced to works that do not support the claim. Needs research.
Acacia caven	Claims of tryptamines in this species are unreferenced. Leaves of this (and/or other plants) and tobacco, are occasionally smoked with Anadenanthera seeds for psychoactive effects
Acacia chundra (syn. A. catechu var. sundra)	Claims of DMT and other tryptamines in leaf and bark are unreferenced. Needs research.
Acacia colei	Claimed to contain up to or more than 1.8% DMT in bark, 0.2-0.6% in leaf, Requires further confirmation.
Acacia complanata	0.3% N-methyl-tetrahydroharman, traces of tetrahydroharman in leaf and stem; independent claims of DMT from bark need confirmation
Acacia concinna	2.1% Nicotine (w/w), 1.2% calycotomine (d/w) from leaves
Acacia confusa	0.074% alkaloids from stems (20% DMT, 80% NMT); NMT and an unidentified tryptamine alkaloid from trunk bark; 2.85% alkaloids from root bark (45% DMT, 55% NMT); 0.005% DMT, 0.009% DMT N-oxide, 0.006% NMT and 0.007% N-chloromethyl-DMT (might be artefact of extraction) from unspecified parts
Acacia constricta	0.02% alkaloids from leaves, including β-methyl-phenethylamine (tentatively identified)
Acacia coriacea	Ash used in Pituri. Not known if psychoactive.
Acacia cornigera	May be psychoactive, as the root is used as an aphrodisiac, and may have been added to the Central American balché beverage. Claims of tryptamines in this species might be speculation. Research needed.
Acacia cultriformis	0.02-0.07% alkaloids in leaves and stems, including tryptamine (tentatively identified) and a phenethylamine. 0.04% alkaloids in seeds and unripe seed pods; tentative observation of 5-MeO-DMT in leaves, stems and flowers
Acacia cuthbertsonii	Has been included on a list of psychoactive plants, but requires supporting information
Acacia delibrata	Has been included on a list of psychoactive plants, but requires supporting information
Acacia drepanolobium	DMT in bark (up to 1.4%) and leaves (0.5-0.8%), young leaves mainly containing tryptamine
Acacia falcata	Psychoactive, but less than 0.02% alkaloids
Acacia farnesiana	Tentative identification of 5-MeO-DMT and an unidentified β-carboline from immature seed pods; tryptamine in stem bark. A claim of β-methyl-phenethylamine from flowers is not supported by the reference given. Ether extracts about 2-6% of the dried leaf mass. Alkaloids are present in the bark and leaves. Others found no alkaloids. Claims of amphetamines and mescaline in the tree appear to be groundless
Acacia filiciana	Has been added to pulque, but its psychoactivity is unknown
Acacia floribunda	Up to 0.18% alkaloids from tops, mostly tryptamine with some phenethylamine; 0.15-1.18% alkaloids from flowers, equal amounts tryptamine and phenethylamine; traces of unidentified alkaloid from bark. Recently found to actually contain mostly DMT (up to 0.1% from leaves, 0.3-0.5% from bark), with bark also containing NMT, and small amounts of tryptamine, harman and norharman
Acacia greggii	0.016% alkaloids from leaves, including (tentatively identified) N-methyl-β-phenethylamine and tyramine
Acacia harpophylla	0.1-0.6% alkaloids in leaves, consisting of phenethylamine and hordenine at a ratio of 2:3; 0.3% alkaloids in bark
Acacia holoserica	Hordenine, 1.2% in bark
Acacia horrida	Has been claimed to be psychoactive, but this is not supported by the reference given
Acacia implexa	Claimed to be psychoactive, but this requires supporting information
Acacia jurema	Putative species claimed to contain DMT and NMT, without a reference; possibly assumed due to supposed use in jurema wine
Acacia karroo	Probably psychoactive; roots used in Zimbabwe as an aphrodisiac and to treat dizziness, convulsions and body pains
Acacia kempeana	Used in Pituri, but not known if psychoactive.
Acacia kettlewelliae	1.3-1.88% alkaloids from leaves and stems, mostly (92%) phenethylamine; 0.9% β-methyl-phenethylamine from leaves
Acacia laeta	Published reports of DMT in the leaf derive from a misreading of a paper that found no DMT in leaves of this species. Needs research
Acacia leucophloea	Tryptamine in root bark
Acacia ligulata	Used in Pituri, but not known if psychoactive.
Acacia longifolia	0.2-1% alkaloids from tops, 0.14-0.29% from flowers; consisted mostly of tryptamine-like alkaloids (tryptamine itself found in some flowers), with small amount of phenethylamine. Some strains have been found to contain up to 0.2% DMT in unspecified parts. Leaves, bark, pods, seeds and flowers all contained varying levels of histamine amides
Acacia sophorae	Contains alkaloids in leaves, stems and unripe seed pods but they have been poorly investigated. A claim of tryptamine in leaveand bark requires a proper reference. Several reports of DMT content unconfirmed
Acacia macradenia	Claimed to contain tryptamine, but without a reference. Needs research
Acacia maidenii	0.13-0.71% alkaloids from bark, consisting of NMT and DMT in about a 2:3 ratio; both also present in leaves. Some varieties of the species are not good alkaloid sources. Tentative identification of 5-MeO-DMT in wood and twigs, NMT in root
Acacia mangium	Rumoured to contain DMT or similar psychoactive alkaloids
Acacia melanoxylon	Some plants may contain DMT in the bark and leaf, but may have been misidentified as most do not. Traces of alkaloids detected in bark, leaf and seed; sometimes no alkaloids
Acacia mellifera	Published reports of DMT in the leaf derive from a misreading of a paper that found no DMT in leaves of this species. Needs research
Acacia mucronata sbsp. longifolia	DMT, NMT, tryptamine, other alkaloids
Acacia nilotica	One published report of DMT in the leaf may derive from a misreading of a paper that found no DMT in leaves of this species. Later analysis tentatively found 5-MeO-DMT in stems, leaves and roots; DMT, NMT and 5-MeO-DMT were tentatively observed in seeds, but follow-up tests were negative. Bark contains unidentified alkaloids Bark in one sample subsequently found to contain an alkaloid which has an Rf value suggesting DMT.
Acacia nilotica subsp. adstringens	DMT and Harmane derivatives
Acacia obtusifolia	0.15-0.6% alkaloids from bark, 0.07% from fresh tips, 0.15-0.3% from dried leaves. A small population seems to contain mainly DMT in bark, with most also containing other alkaloids including NMT, tryptamine, harman and norharman; leaves may contain more NMT than DMT. Some assays showed tentative presence of 5-MeO-DMT and/or bufotenine but these are unconfirmed and other assays did not detect them
Acacia oerfota (syn. A. nubica)	0.016% DMT in leaf; a claim of NMT in this species is unreferenced
Acacia penninervis	Claimed to be psychoactive, but supporting information is needed. Bark and leaves have been used to poison fish
Acacia phlebophylla	0.3% DMT in leaf; a claim of NMT could not be found in the reference given and needs verification. Species is rare and threatened
Acacia podalyriaefolia	0.11-0.29% alkaloids in leaves and stems, 0.11% from seeds and pods, mostly tryptamine and sometimes with phenethylamine also present; a later analysis found 0.06% tryptamine from leaves (w/w)
Acacia polyacantha ssp. campylacantha (syn. A. campylacantha)	0.004%% DMT in leaf; claims of NMT and other tryptamines in leaf and bark are not supported by the reference given
Acacia pravissima	Up to 0.44% alkaloids from leaves and stems, mostly phenethylamine
Acacia prominens (syn. A. praetervisa)	0.17-0.65% alkaloids from stems and leaves, 1.8% from flowering tops, consisting of phenethylamine and β-methyl-phenethylamine
Acacia pruinocarpa	Ash used in Pituri. Not known if psychoactive.
Acacia pruinosa	0.02-0.09% alkaloids from stems and leaves, 0.04% from tops, mostly tryptamine with some phenethylamine
Acacia pycnantha	Less than 0.01% total alkaloids in leaf, sometimes none. 0.4% DMT in single tree
Acacia retinodes	0.01% Nicotine was reported from leaves, but identity of the plant was not certain; claims of DMT and NMT in the plant require verification or a proper reference
Acacia rigidula	0.025% alkaloids from leaves, including N-methyl-phenethylamine and N-methyl-tyramine (both tentatively identified). Claims of DMT, NMT, amphetamines, mescaline, nicotine and many other alkaloids are suspect
Acacia roemeriana	0.036% alkaloids from leaves, including β-methyl-phenethylamine, tyramine and N-methyl-tyramine
Acacia salicina	Ash used in Pituri. Not known if psychoactive.
Acacia schaffneri	A claim of β-methyl-phenethylamine, phenethylamine, amphetamines and mescaline in this species lacks a reference and is highly dubious
Acacia schottii	β-methyl-phenethylamine in leaves, tentatively identified
Senegalia senegal	0.003% DMT in leaf; claim of DMT in bark requires verification
Acacia seyal	Published reports of DMT in the leaf derive from a misreading of a paper that found no DMT in leaves of this species. Ether extracts about 1-7% of the dried leaf mass.
Acacia sieberiana	Published reports of DMT in the leaf derive from a misreading of a paper that found no DMT in leaves of this species. However it is rumoured that unpublished analysis has found DMT in the plant
Acacia simplex (syn. A. simplicifolia)	3.6% alkaloids from leaves and stem bark (40% NMT, 22.5% DMT, 12.7% 2-methyl-tetrahydro-β-carboline, and traces of N-formyl-NMT which might be an artefact of extraction)
Acacia spectabilis	0.21-0.35% alkaloids from leaves and stems, about 2/3 phenethylamine
Acacia suaveolens	Up to 0.89% alkaloids from leaves and stems, 0.05-0.17% from unripe pods, mostly phenethylamine
Acacia texensis	0.008% alkaloids from leaves including β-methyl-phenethylamine and tyramine (tentatively identified)
Acacia tortilis	Published reports of DMT in the leaf derive from a misreading of a paper that found no DMT in leaves of this species. Needs research
Acacia vestita	Tryptamine, in the leaf and stem (up to 83% of total alkaloids); alkaloid content was highest in autumn and spring (0.12-0.28%), lowest in summer and winter (0.03-0.08%)
Acacia victoriae	Tentative positive for DMT in aerial parts of a 1 yr old plant, and 5-MeO-DMT in roots of 2 yr old seedlings; a formal screening found no alkaloids in leaf and stem. Appears to contain DMT based on human bioassays

== Acacia species having little or no alkaloids in the material sampled ==
Species containing a concentration of alkaloids of 0-0.02% include:

- Acacia acinacea
- Acacia baileyana
- Acacia decurrens
- Acacia dealbata
- Acacia mearnsii
- Acacia drummondii
- Acacia elata
- Acacia falcata
- Acacia leprosa
- Acacia linearis
- Acacia melanoxylon
- Acacia retinodes
- Acacia saligna
- Acacia stricta
- Acacia verticillata
- Acacia visco
- Acacia vestita

== See also ==
- Entheogenic drugs and the archaeological record
- List of plants used for smoking
- List of psychoactive plants
- List of psychoactive plants, fungi, and animals
- The Encyclopedia of Psychoactive Plants
- Dimethyltryptamine (DMT)
