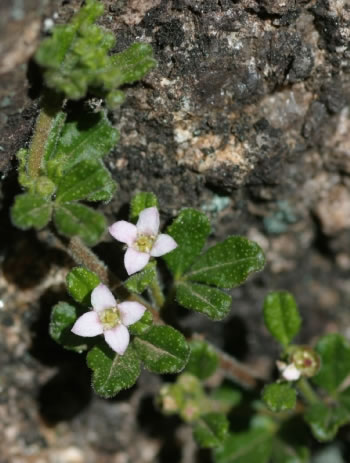

Conservation status
- Endangered (EPBC Act)

Scientific classification
- Kingdom: Plantae
- Clade: Tracheophytes
- Clade: Angiosperms
- Clade: Eudicots
- Clade: Rosids
- Order: Sapindales
- Family: Rutaceae
- Genus: Zieria
- Species: Z. obcordata

Binomial name
- Zieria obcordata A.Cunn.

= Zieria obcordata =

Obcordate-leafed zieria

Species of flowering plant

Zieria obcordata, commonly known as obcordate-leafed zieria, is a plant in the citrus family Rutaceae and endemic to New South Wales. It is an aromatic, densely branched, rounded shrub with small, hairy, three-part leaves and up to three white to pale pink flowers with four petals and four stamens arranged in the leaf axils. It occurs in two disjunct populations in the central-west of the state.

== Description ==
Zieria obcordata is an aromatic, densely-branched, rounded shrub which grows to a height of 0.5 m (2 ft) and has hairy branches when young. The leaves are composed of three wedge-shaped to heart-shaped leaflets with the narrower end towards the base. The leaves have a petiole 1–3 mm (0.04–0.1 in) long and the central leaflet is 3–9 mm (0.1–0.4 in) long and 1–4 mm (0.04–0.2 in) wide. The upper surface of the leaflets is slightly warty and both surfaces are covered with simple hairs. The flowers are white to pale pink and are arranged singly or in groups of up to three in leaf axils, the groups shorter than the leaves. The sepals are triangular, about 2 mm (0.08 in) long and wide and hairy. The four petals are about 2 mm (0.08 in) long and sometimes hairy. Flowering occurs mainly in September and October and is followed in summer by fruit which are warty, hairy capsules.

== Taxonomy and naming ==
Zieria obcordata was first formally described in 1825 by Allan Cunningham and the description was published in Geographical Memoirs on New South Wales. The specific epithet (obcordata) is derived from the Latin word cordata meaning "heart-shaped" with the prefix ob- meaning "towards".

== Distribution and habitat ==
This zieria grows in open shrubby woodland and on rocky hillsides in two disjunct populations near Wellington and near Bathurst. It often occurs with rough-barked angophora (Angophora floribunda) and hickory wattle (Acacia implexa) and weeping boree (Acacia vestita).

== Conservation ==
Obcordate-leafed zieria is classified as "endangered" under the New South Wales Threatened Species Conservation Act and the Commonwealth Government Environment Protection and Biodiversity Conservation Act 1999 (EPBC) Act. The main threats to the species are weed invasion, inappropriate fire regimes, grazing and land clearing.
