= Acacia macradenia =

Zig-zag wattle

Conservation status
- Least Concern (IUCN 3.1)

Scientific classification
- Kingdom: Plantae
- Clade: Tracheophytes
- Clade: Angiosperms
- Clade: Eudicots
- Clade: Rosids
- Order: Fabales
- Family: Fabaceae
- Subfamily: Caesalpinioideae
- Clade: Mimosoid clade
- Genus: Acacia
- Species: A. macradenia

Binomial name
- Acacia macradenia Benth.
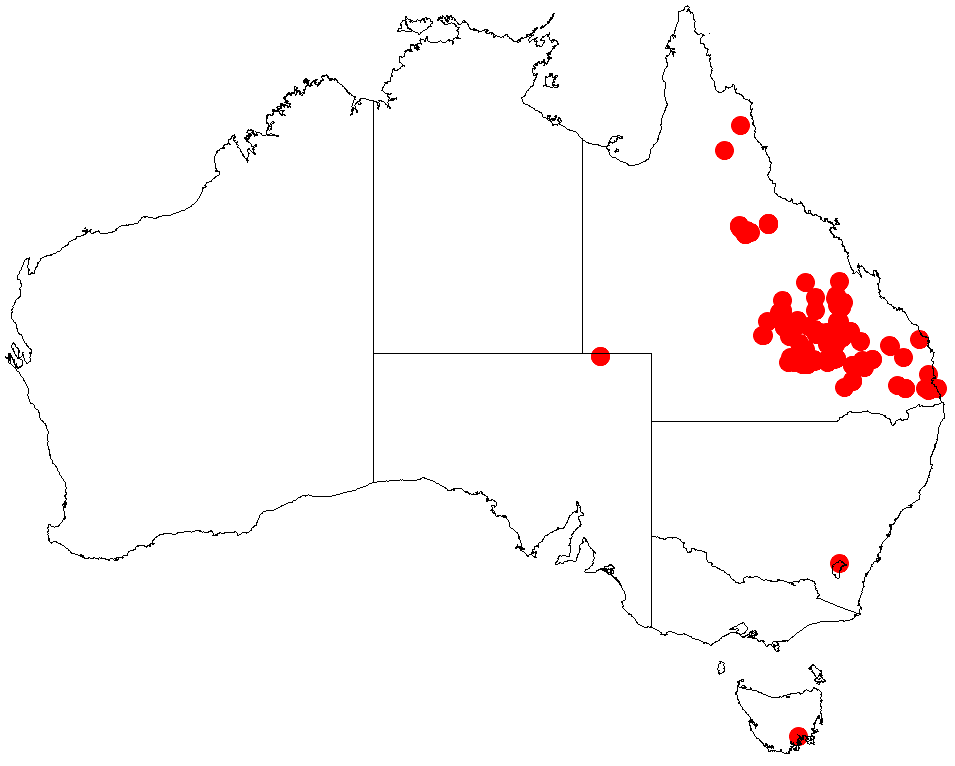
- Occurrence data from AVH

Synonyms
- Racosperma macradenium (Benth.) Pedley

Species of legume

Habit between Roma and Taroom

Acacia macradenia commonly known as zig-zag wattle, is a species of flowering plant in the family Fabaceae and is endemic to southeastern Queensland, Australia. It is a shrub or tree with glabrous, zig-zag, more or less pendulous branchlets, narrowly elliptic to narrowly oblong phyllodes, hardened stipules, spherical heads of golden yellow flowers, and thinly papery pods.

== Description ==
Acacia macradenia is a shrub or tree that typically grows to a height of 3–5 m (9.8–16.4 ft) and has more or less pendulous, zig-zag, glabrous branchlets. Its phyllodes are leathery, narrowly elliptic to more or less narrowly oblong, 130–250 mm (5.1–9.8 in) long, mostly 10–25 mm (0.39–0.98 in) wide, narrowed and curved at the base and glabrous. The midvein is prominent and connects with the lower edge, and there are curved, hardened stipules at the base of the phyllodes. There is an elongated gland 10–15 mm (0.39–0.59 in) above the pulvinus, sometimes with one or two small glands above the middle of the phyllodes. The flowers are borne in 8 to 15 globular clusters in racemes 20–50 mm (0.79–1.97 in) long, prolifically in upper axils, on more or less glabrous peduncles 3–6 mm (0.12–0.24 in) long. Each head has densely arranged 35 to 50 golden yellow flowers. Flowering occurs in August, and although its flowering period is short, it is such a striking plant, that it is often cultivated. Mature fruit up to 120 mm (4.7 in) long, 5–6 mm (0.20–0.24 in) wide, thinly leathery, glabrous and found in October. The seeds are more or less oblong, about 4 mm (0.16 in) long with a club-shaped aril about as long as the seed, on one side, at the base.

== Taxonomy ==
Acacia macradenia was first formally described in 1848 by George Bentham in Thomas Mitchell's Journal of an Expedition into the Interior of Tropical Australia. The specific epithet (macradenia) means 'large gland', and refers to the elongated gland on the phyllode margin.

Hybrids with A. bancroftiorum are noted by Leslie Pedley. They resemble A. holotricha. Hybrids between A. macradenia and fringed wattle (A. fimbriata) are known in cultivation.

== Distribution and habitat ==
Zig-zag wattle is widespread in southeastern Queensland from Clermont to Surat with a northern outlier near Torrens Creek. It grows in stony and sandy soil, often near creeks, in woodland, sometimes in vine thicket. It is cultivated in areas around Chinchilla and Pentland.

== Ecology ==
Acacia macradenia is a shrub that grows preferably in cool climate to warm climate by sandy or gravelly areas near creeks. The cold temperature prepares and enhances a stronger flowering effect of the seeds when temperatures increase. Acacia macradenia can adapt to areas affected by air pollution. In an experiment, Acacia macradenia seeds were placed in environments with different concentrations of air pollution and results show stable photosynthetic and transpiration rate relative to a non-polluted environment.

In an experiment conducted to test the effect of seed germination vs. temperature on Acacia seeds, the results showed that seeds that were treated with hot water had higher germination compared to seeds that were treated with cooler water.

== Dispersal ==
Acacia macradenia seeds are spread naturally by birds, ants, and other animals, though the largest contributor to its dispersal are from the direct results of planting by humans. It has been used in revegetation efforts and is also planted for its ornamental value, with "unusual architecture and striking floral displays". Due to the high seed dispersal rate of A. macradenia, its growth habits could potentially classify the species as invasive; it continues to inhabit and dominate new areas across Australia. Australia has no law to inhibit the spread of A. macradenia. The successful growing habits of A. macradenia seem to be encouraged by the hard-shelled seeds' ability to survive and outlive other invasive Acacia species in Australia.

== Use in horticulture ==
Acacia macradenia prefers a well-drained situation, preferably in full sun. Successful cultivation has been recorded in coastal areas in eastern Australia from Townsville south to Melbourne. However, plants have succumbed to heavy frosts in some inland locations such as Canberra.
