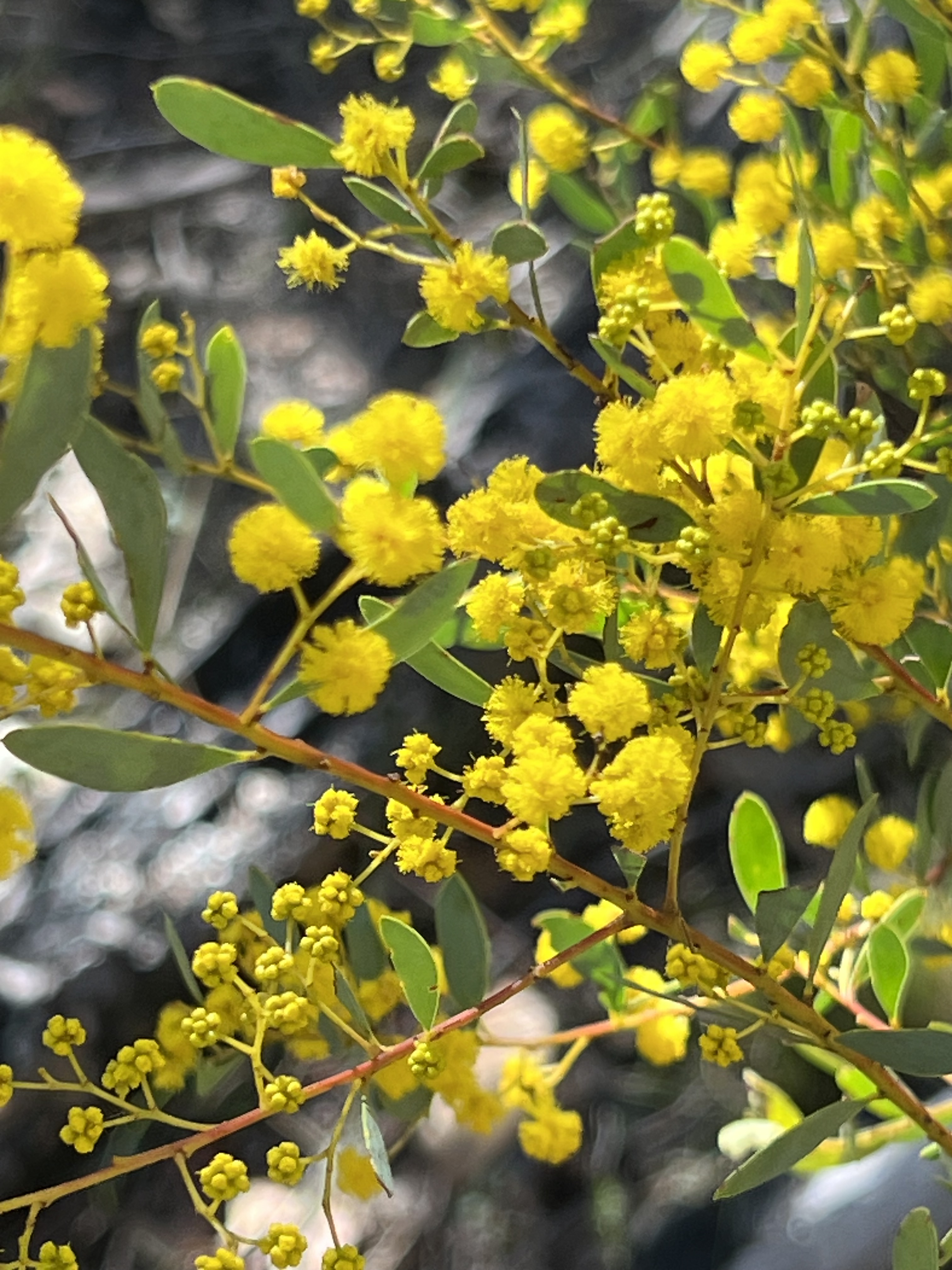

Scientific classification
- Kingdom: Plantae
- Clade: Tracheophytes
- Clade: Angiosperms
- Clade: Eudicots
- Clade: Rosids
- Order: Fabales
- Family: Fabaceae
- Subfamily: Caesalpinioideae
- Clade: Mimosoid clade
- Genus: Acacia
- Species: A. buxifolia

Binomial name
- Acacia buxifolia A.Cunn.
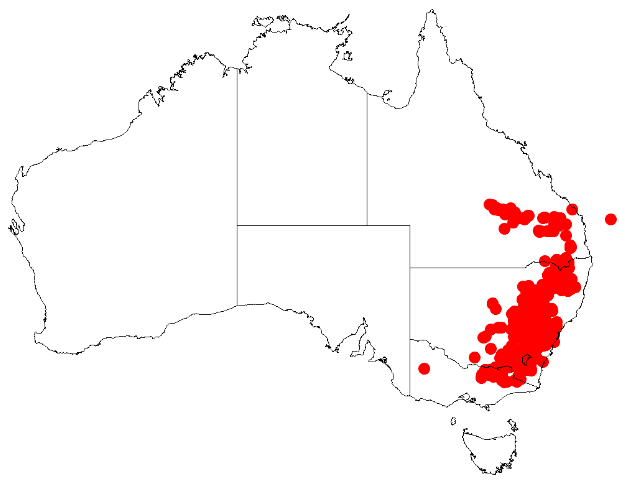
- Occurrence data from AVH

Synonyms
- ? Acacia brevifolia Lodd., G.Lodd. & W.Lodd. nom. inval., nom. nud.; ? Acacia brevifolia G.Lodd. ex G.Don; Acacia buxifolia var. neglecta Maiden; ? Acacia neglecta Maiden & R.T.Baker; Acacia papulaeformis Walp. nom. inval.; Racosperma buxifolium (A.Cunn.) Pedley

= Acacia buxifolia =

Box-leaf wattle

Species of legume

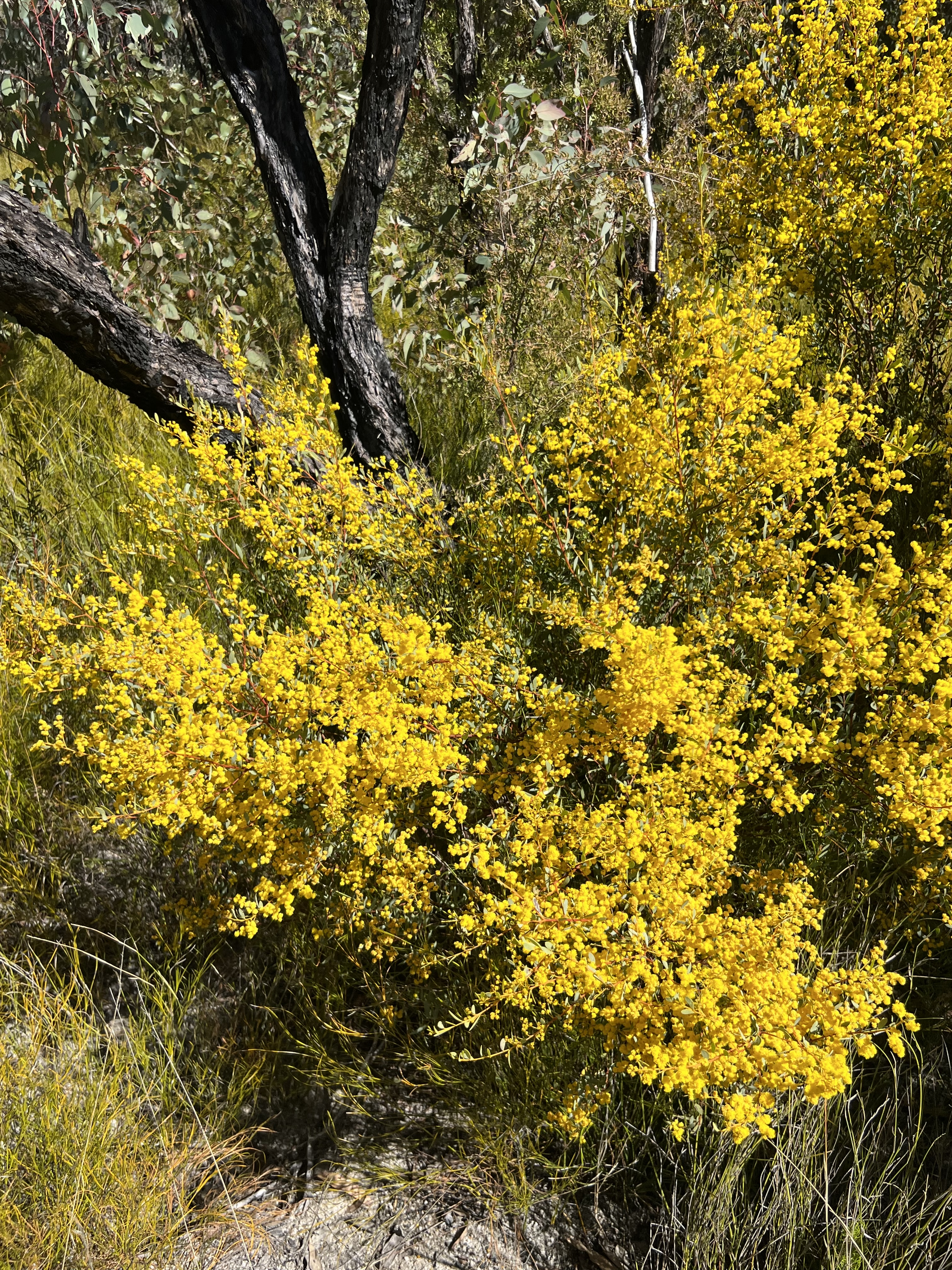
Habit near Torrington, New South Wales

Acacia buxifolia, commonly known as box-leaf wattle, is a species of flowering plant in the family Fabaceae and is endemic to eastern Australia. It is an erect or spreading shrub with narrowly ellipitic to oblong or egg-shaped phyllodes, cylindrical heads of bright yellow flowers, and straight or strongly curved, firmly papery to thinly leathery pods.

== Description ==
Acacia buxifolia an erect or spreading shrub that typically grows to a height of 1–4 m (3 ft 3 in – 13 ft 1 in) and has glabrous branchlets. Its phyllodes are narrowly elliptic to oblong or egg-shaped with the narrower end towards the base, 10–45 mm (0.39–1.77 in) long, 2–11 mm (0.079–0.433 in) wide and green to glaucous. The flowers are arranged in spherical heads of 2 to 14 in racemes 5–80 mm (0.20–3.15 in) long in axils on a peduncle 2–5 mm (0.079–0.197 in) long. Each head has 7 to 29 bright yellow flowers. Flowering occurs from July to November and the pods are usually firmly papery to thinly leathery, 30–70 mm (1.2–2.8 in) long and 4.5–7 mm (0.18–0.28 in) wide containing oblong to egg-shaped black seeds 4.0–4.5 mm (0.16–0.18 in) long with a club-shaped aril.

== Taxonomy ==
Acacia buxifolia was first formally described in 1825 by the botanist Allan Cunningham in Barron Field's book, Geographical Memoirs on New South Wales, from specimens collected near the Macquarie River. The specific epithet (buxifolia) means 'box-tree-leaved'. Two subspecies of A. buxifolia have been described, and the names are accepted by the Australian Plant Census:

- Acacia buxifolia A.Cunn. subsp. buxifolia has phyllodes usually 10–30 mm (0.39–1.18 in) long and heads of 7 to 12 flowers.
- Acacia buxifolia subsp. pubifloraPedley has phyllodes usually 15–45 mm (0.59–1.77 in) long and heads of 17 to 29 flowers.

== Distribution and habitat ==
Box-leaf wattle grows in forest, woodland and heath, often on rocky outcrops. Subspecies buxifolia occurs in scattered locations from Stanthorpe in south-eastern Queensland, in eastern New South Wales and in north-eastern Victoria. Subspecies pubiflora occurs in scattered places from near Tambo in Queensland to Tenterfield in northern New South Wales, and is mostly found near Emmaville in New South Wales.

== Use in horticulture ==
Acacia buxifolia is a hardy, winter-flowering ornamental that attracts birds and insects, although it should not be planted within 2 m (6 ft 7 in) of sewer mains.

== See also ==
- List of Acacia species
