= Acacia acuminata subsp. acuminata =

Scientific classification
- Kingdom: Plantae
- Clade: Tracheophytes
- Clade: Angiosperms
- Clade: Eudicots
- Clade: Rosids
- Order: Fabales
- Family: Fabaceae
- Subfamily: Caesalpinioideae
- Clade: Mimosoid clade
- Genus: Acacia
- Species: A. acuminata Benth.
- Subspecies: A. a. subsp. acuminata

Trinomial name
- Acacia acuminata subsp. acuminata

Synonyms
- Acacia acuminata var. ciliata Meisn.

Subspecies of plant

Acacia acuminata subsp. acuminata is a perennial shrub or tree. Common names for it include jam and raspberry jam. It is native to Western Australia.

This species is called raspberry jam due to the scent of the timber harvested from it.

== See also ==
- List of Acacia species
