= Acacia holotricha =

Scientific classification
- Kingdom: Plantae
- Clade: Tracheophytes
- Clade: Angiosperms
- Clade: Eudicots
- Clade: Rosids
- Order: Fabales
- Family: Fabaceae
- Subfamily: Caesalpinioideae
- Clade: Mimosoid clade
- Genus: Acacia
- Species: A. holotricha

Binomial name
- Acacia holotricha Pedley
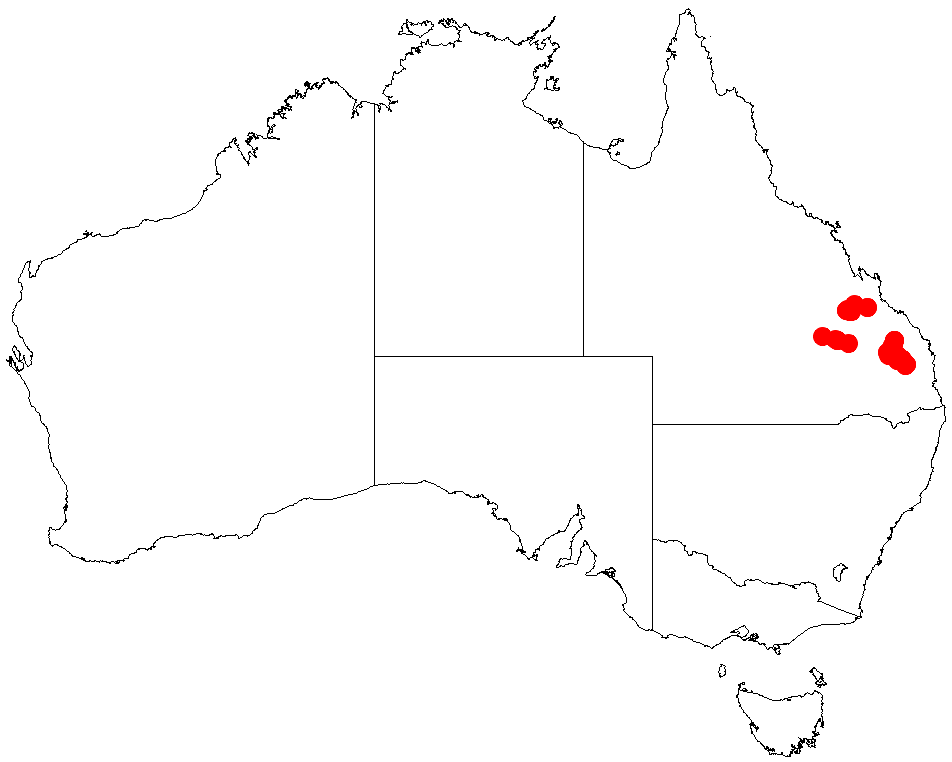
- Occurrence data from AVH

Synonyms
- Acacia sp. (Eidsvold P.I.Forster PIF4626); Racosperma holotrichum (Pedley) Pedley

Species of legume

Acacia holotricha is a species of flowering plant in the family Fabaceae and is endemic to a south-east Queensland, Australia. It is a shrub or tree with narrowly elliptic phyllodes, spherical heads of pale yellow flowers, and linear, thinly leathery pods.

== Description ==
Acacia holotricha is a shrub or tree that typically grows to a height of 5 to 10 m (16 to 33 ft), with ribbed, dark coloured branchlets, and is generally covered with velvety, shaggy hairs. Its phyllodes are narrowly elliptic, 120–170 mm (4.7–6.7 in) long, 36–60 mm (1.4–2.4 in) wide and sometimes sparsely hairy. The phyllodes have a prominent midrib that shares the lower 5 mm (0.20 in) of the lower edge, above the prominent pulvinus. The flowers are borne in seven to ten spherical heads in a raceme 30–90 mm (1.2–3.5 in) long on peduncles 2–6 mm (0.079–0.236 in) long. Each head has about 50 pale yellow flowers. The pods are linear, up to 180 mm (7.1 in) long 8–9 mm (0.31–0.35 in) wide, thinly leathery, rounded over the seeds and slightly constricted between them.

== Taxonomy ==
Acacia holotricha was first formally described by Leslie Pedley in 1980 in the journal Austrobaileya from specimens collected on Glenhaughton Station about 55 km (34 mi) north-west of Taroom in 1974.

== Distribution ==
This species of wattle is only known from the type locality and 200 km (120 mi) further north in the Duaringa area, in south-eastern Queensland.

== Conservation status ==
Acacia holotricha is listed as of "least concern" under the Queensland Government Nature Conservation Act 1992.

== See also ==
- List of Acacia species
