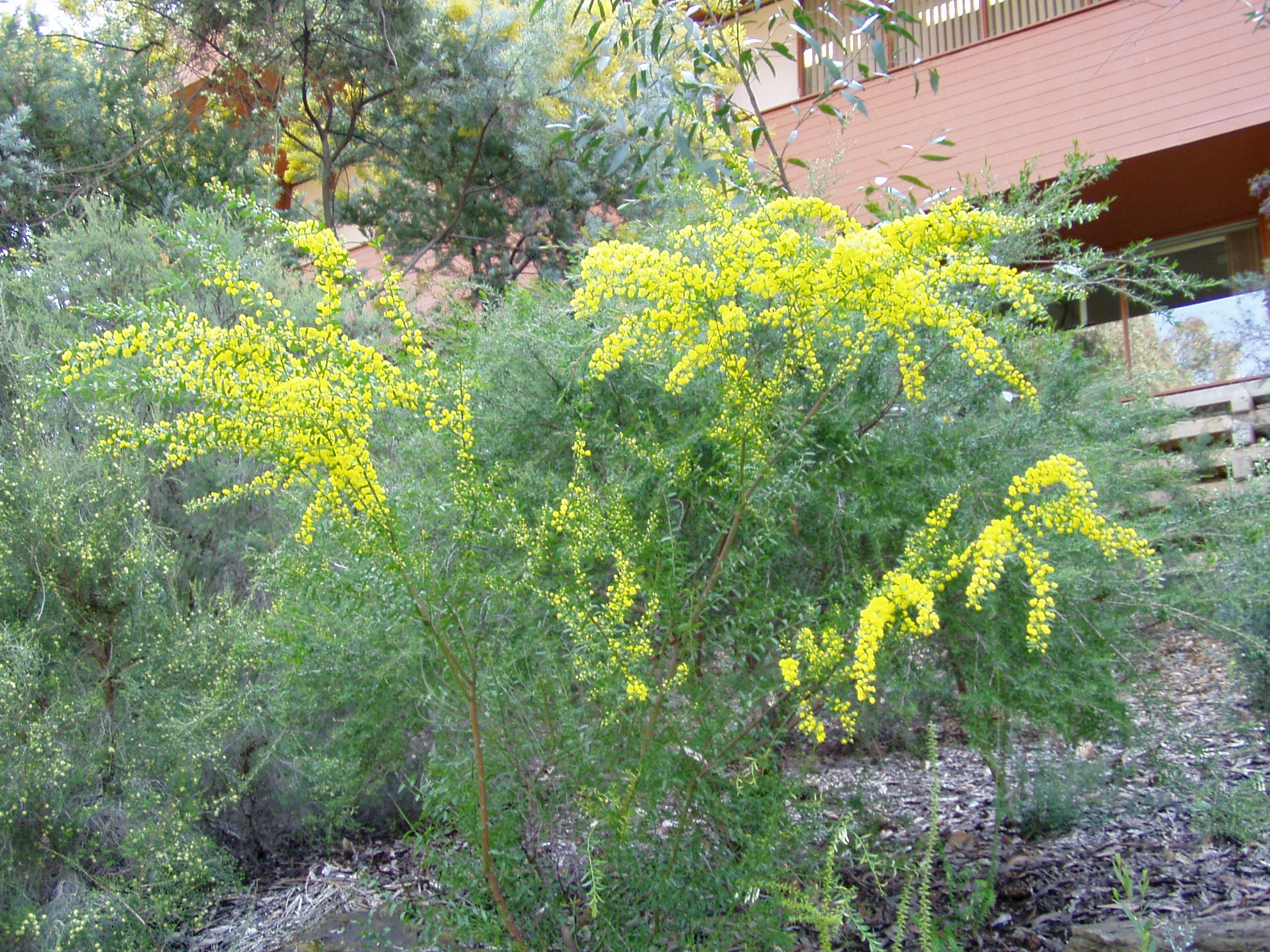

Scientific classification
- Kingdom: Plantae
- Clade: Embryophytes
- Clade: Tracheophytes
- Clade: Spermatophytes
- Clade: Angiosperms
- Clade: Eudicots
- Clade: Rosids
- Order: Fabales
- Family: Fabaceae
- Subfamily: Caesalpinioideae
- Clade: Mimosoid clade
- Genus: Acacia
- Species: A. acinacea

Binomial name
- Acacia acinacea Lindl.
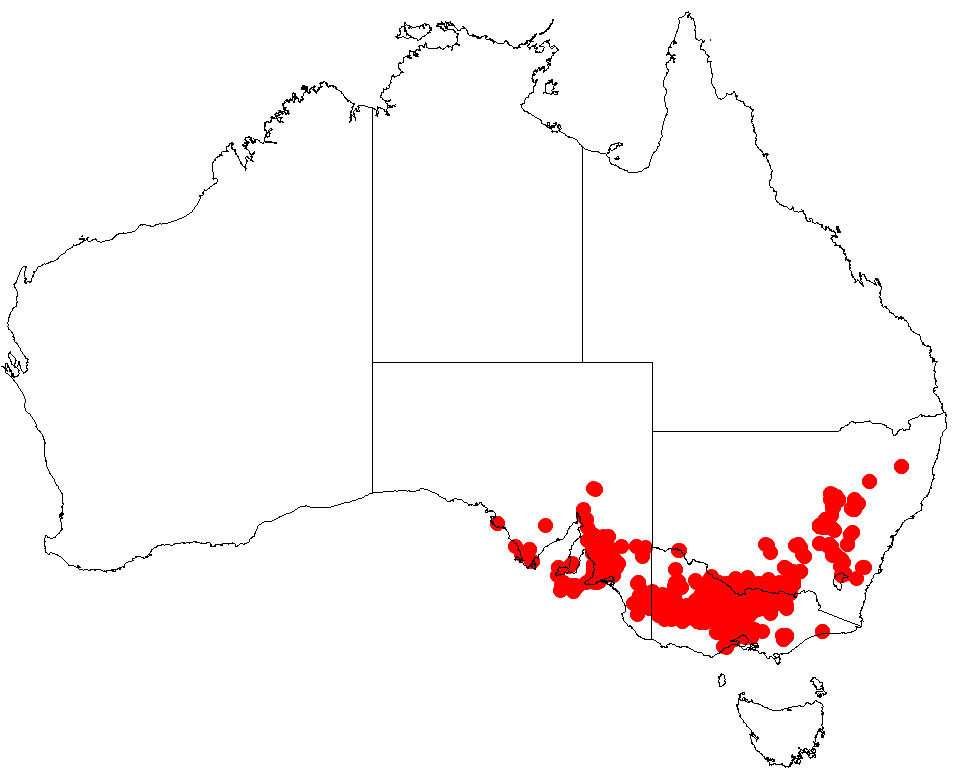
- Occurrence data from AVH

Synonyms
- Acacia acinacea Lindl. var. acinacea; Acacia cyclophylla Schltdl.; Acacia latrobei Meisn.; Acacia latrobii Meisn. orth. var.; Acacia obliqua A.Cunn. ex Benth. nom. illeg.; Acacia rotundifolia Hook.; Racosperma acinaceum (Lindl.) Pedley

= Acacia acinacea =

Gold dust wattle

Species of plant

Acacia acinacea, commonly known as gold dust wattle, wreath wattle or round-leaf wattle. is a species of flowering plant in the family Fabaceae and is endemic to south-eastern continental Australia. It is a bushy or straggling shrub with asymmetric, narrowly oblong to broadly egg-shaped phyllodes with the narrower end towards the base, flowers arranged in a spherical heads 4.0–4.5 mm (0.16–0.18 in) in diameter with 8 to 20 flowers, and a spirally coiled to twisted pods up to 3.0–4.5 mm (0.12–0.18 in) long.

== Description ==
Acacia acinacea is a bushy or straggling, open shrub that typically grows to a height of around 2.5 m (8 ft 2 in). Its phyllodes are asymmetric, narrowly oblong to lance-shaped or egg-shaped with the narrower end towards the base, 4–15 mm (0.16–0.59 in) long and 2 to 8 mm (0.079 to 0.315 in) wide. There is a small point on the end of the phyllodes, off-set from the tip. It blooms, usually prolifically, between July and November producing one or two spherical heads in each leaf axil, the heads with a diameter of 4 to 4.5 mm (0.16 to 0.18 in) containing 8 to 20 golden-yellow flowers. The pods are spirally coiled to twisted, 3.0–4.5 mm (0.12–0.18 in) wide and glabrous, with a hard outer surface. The seeds are shiny, more or less oblong and 4 to 5 mm (0.16 to 0.20 in) with a club-shaped aril that is up to half as long as the seed.

== Taxonomy ==
The species was first formally described by the botanist John Lindley in 1838 as part of Thomas Mitchell's work Three Expeditions into the interior of Eastern Australia. The specific epithet, acinacea, derives from the Latin for a short Persian sword (acinaces) and references the shape of the phyllodes.

== Distribution ==
Gold dust wattle is widespread from near Melrose in South Australia, including in the Mount Lofty Ranges, Kangaroo Island and southern Flinders Ranges, throughout most of Victoria, and south from the Gilgandra district in New South Wales. It is often found in hilly country and grows well in sand, sandy loam and gravelly soils as a part of Eucalyptus woodlands, woodland heath and open mallee scrubland communities.

== Gallery ==
Acacia acinacea

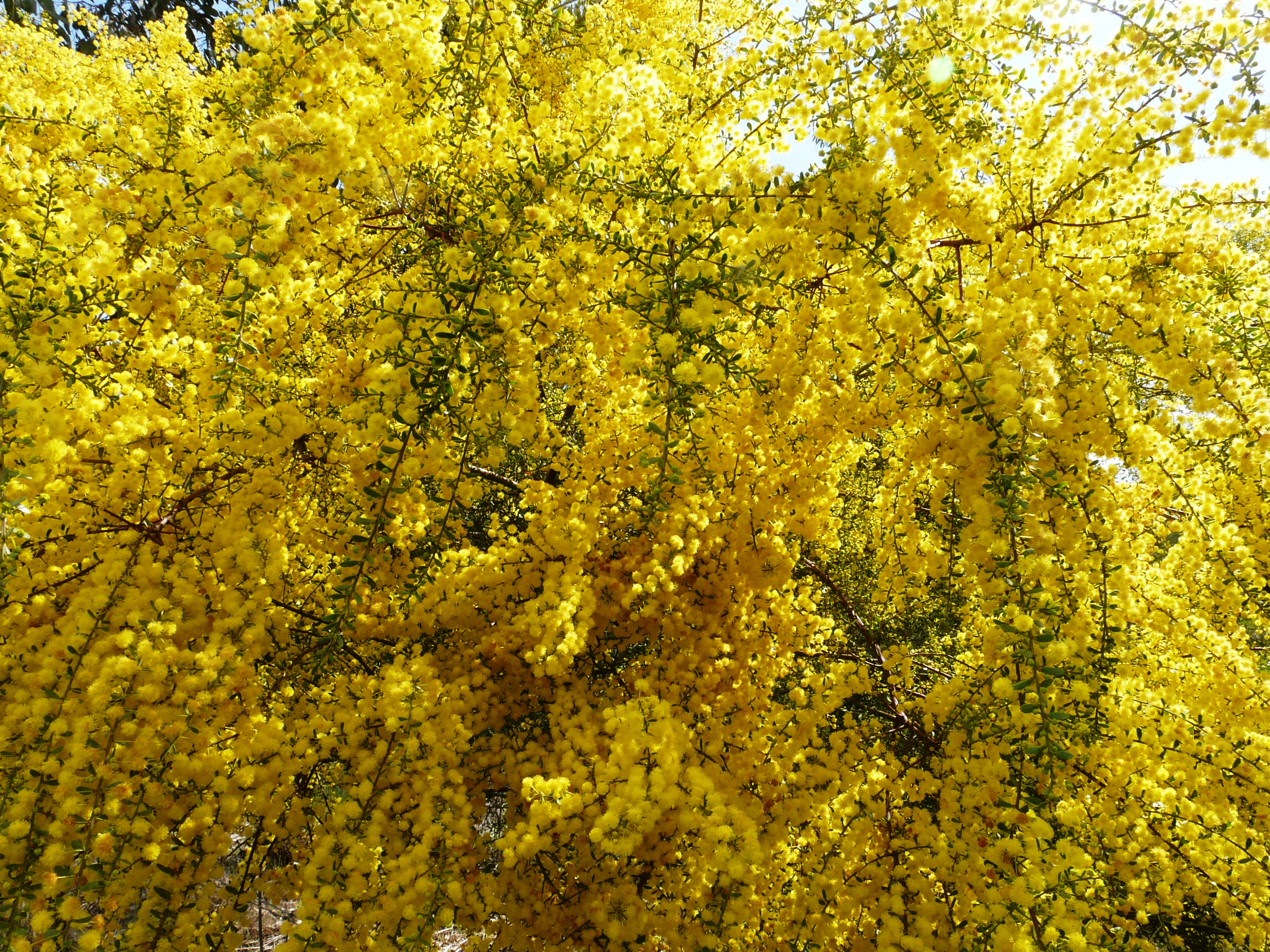

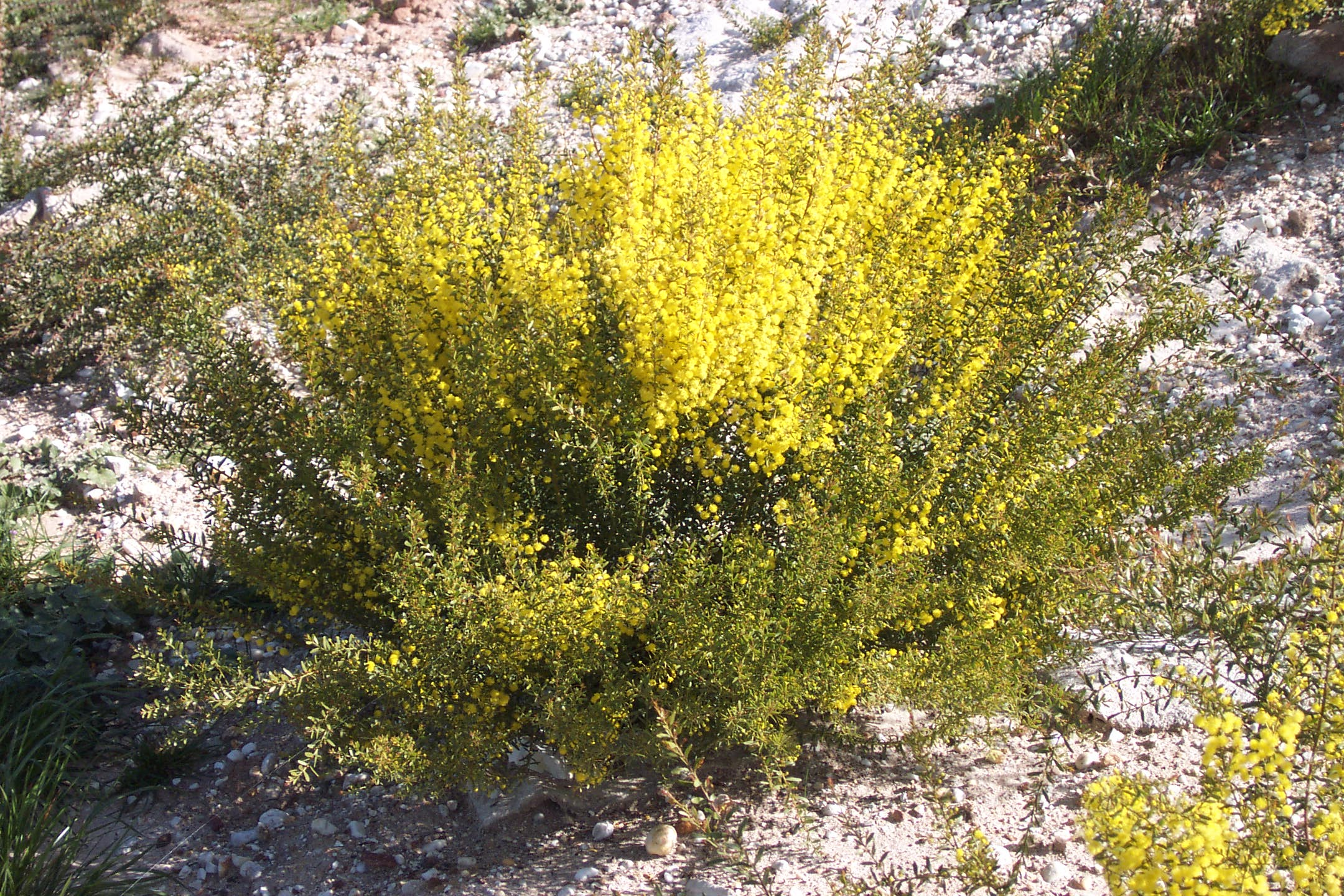

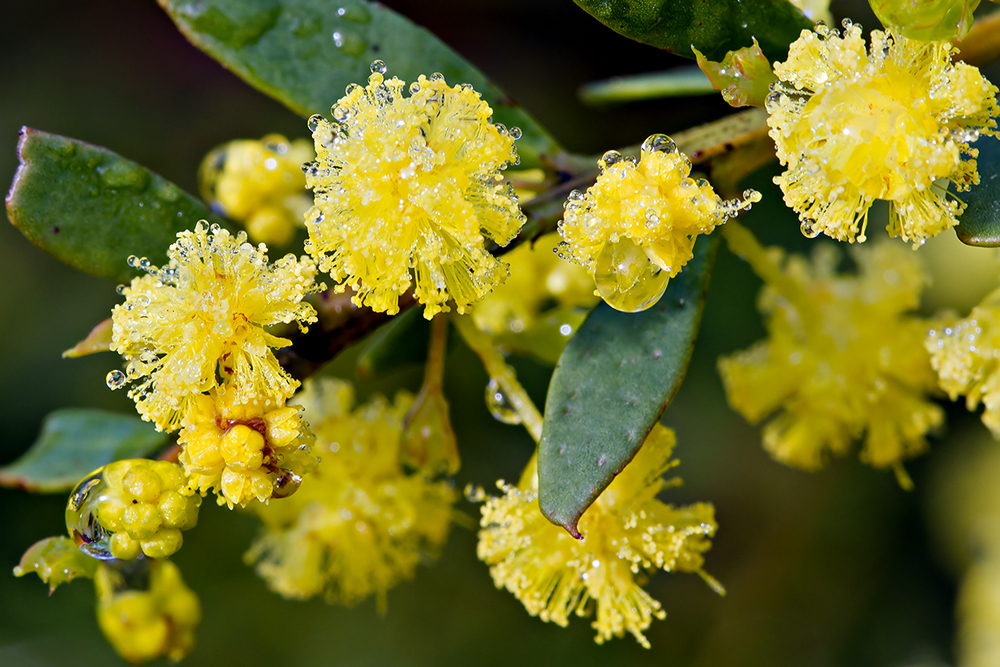

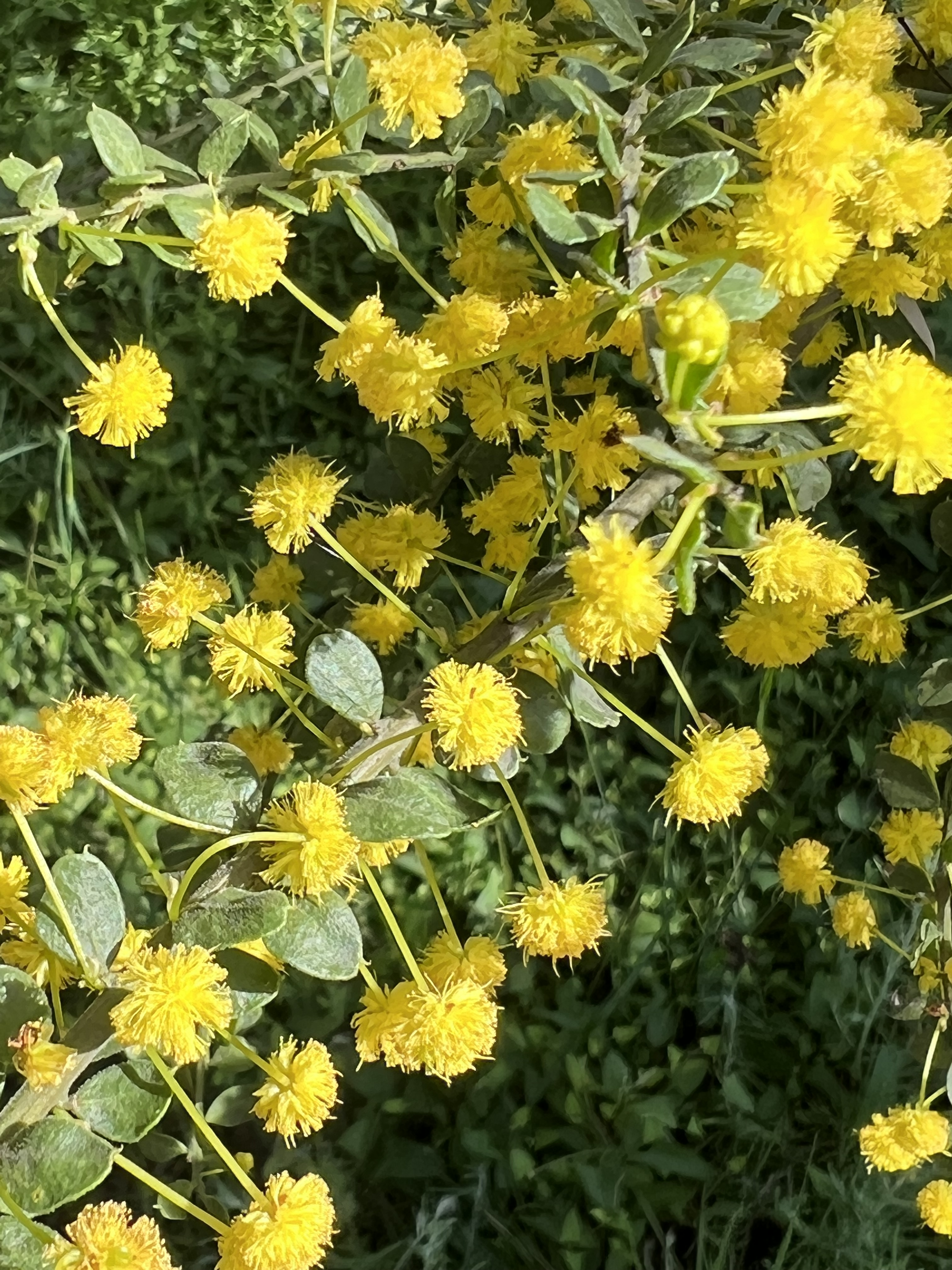

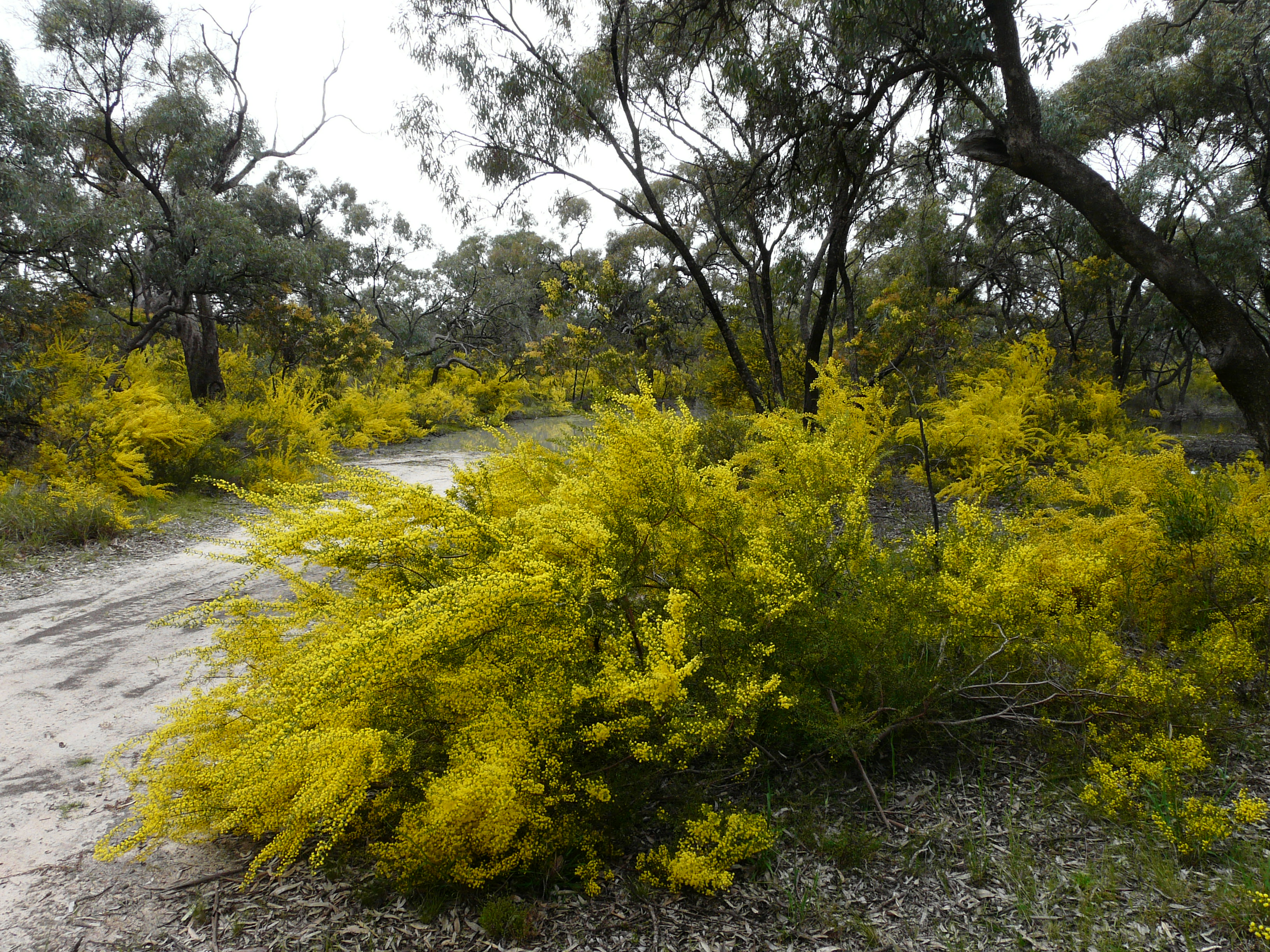
