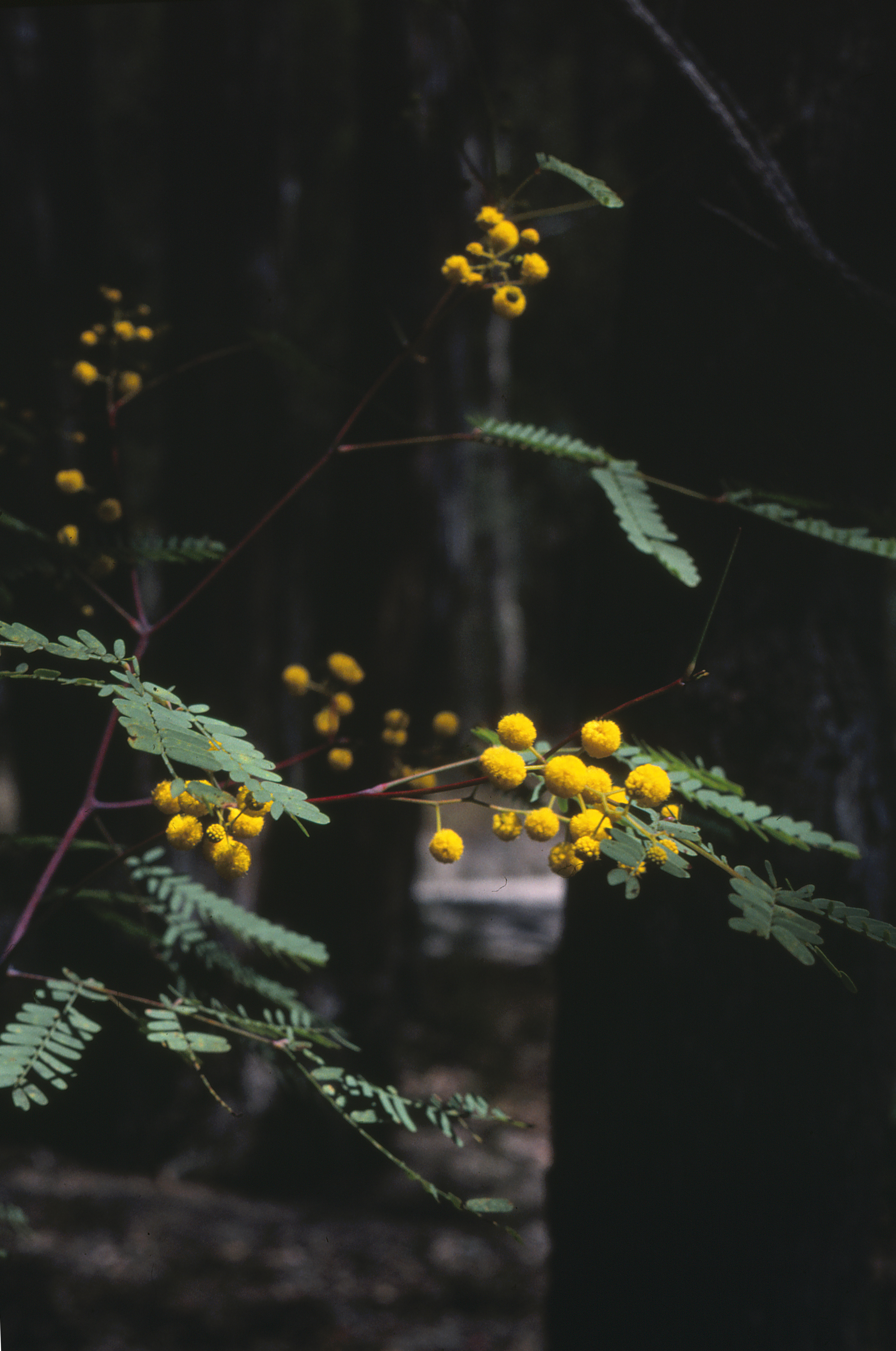
- In Girraween National Park

Scientific classification
- Kingdom: Plantae
- Clade: Embryophytes
- Clade: Tracheophytes
- Clade: Spermatophytes
- Clade: Angiosperms
- Clade: Eudicots
- Clade: Rosids
- Order: Fabales
- Family: Fabaceae
- Subfamily: Caesalpinioideae
- Clade: Mimosoid clade
- Genus: Acacia
- Species: A. pruinosa

Binomial name
- Acacia pruinosa A.Cunn. ex Benth.
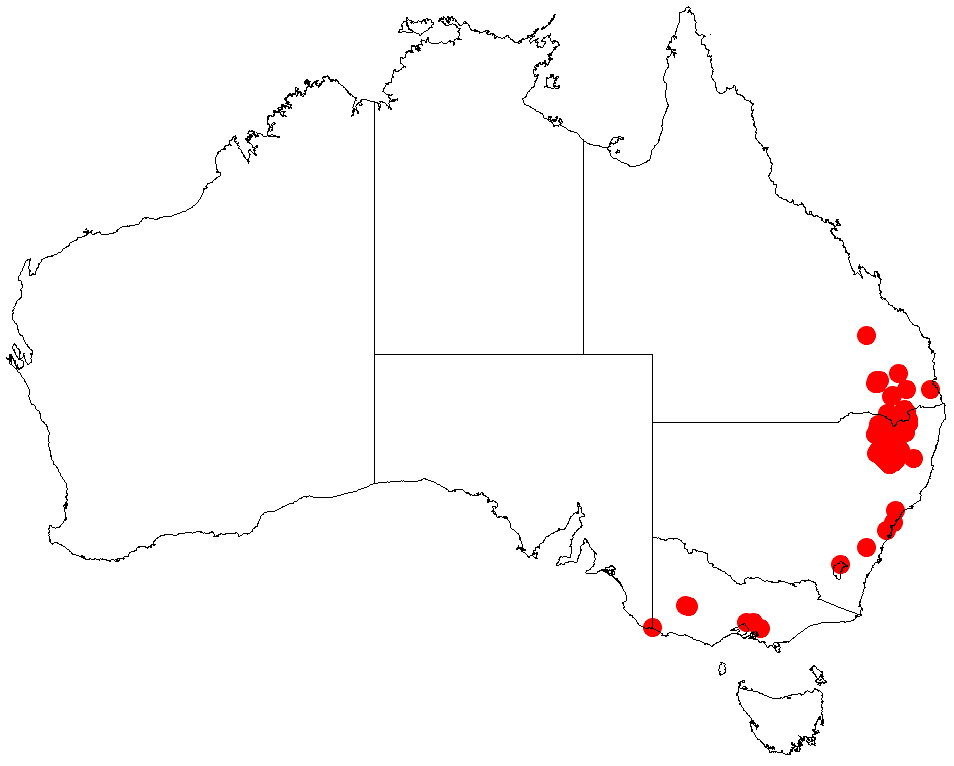
- Occurrence data from AVH

= Acacia pruinosa =

Species of legume

Acacia pruinosa, commonly known as the frosty wattle, is a species of Acacia native to eastern Australia.

== Description ==
The spreading shrub or tree typically grows to a height of 1 to 6 metres (3 to 20 ft) and has smooth bark with terete branchlets. The glabrous leaves are 2 to 6.5 cm (0.79 to 2.56 in) in length and have one prominent gland near the middle of the lowermost pair of pinnae. There are between one and five pairs of pinnae that have a length of 3 to 9 cm (1.2 to 3.5 in) and 7 to 20 pairs of oblong pinnules that are 8 to 17 mm (0.31 to 0.67 in) in length and 2.5 to 5 mm (0.098 to 0.197 in) wide. The plant flowers between August and October producing 4 to 19 inflorescences in panicles that have an axis with a length of 2 to 15 cm (0.79 to 5.91 in). The spherical flower-heads with a diameter of 5 to 10 mm (0.20 to 0.39 in) contain 40 to 60 yellow to bright yellow flowers. After flowering leathery straight to curved, flat seed pods form with a length of 4 to 14 cm (1.6 to 5.5 in) and a width of 6 to 12 mm (0.24 to 0.47 in).

The type specimen was collected by the botanist Alan Cunningham in 1827 on the Liverpool Plains of New South Wales.

== Distribution ==
It is found in northeastern New South Wales from around Uralla in the south stretching north into southeastern Queensland. It is often a part of dry sclerophyll forest and woodland communities and grows in sandy and skeletal soils over and around granite.

== See also ==
- List of Acacia species
