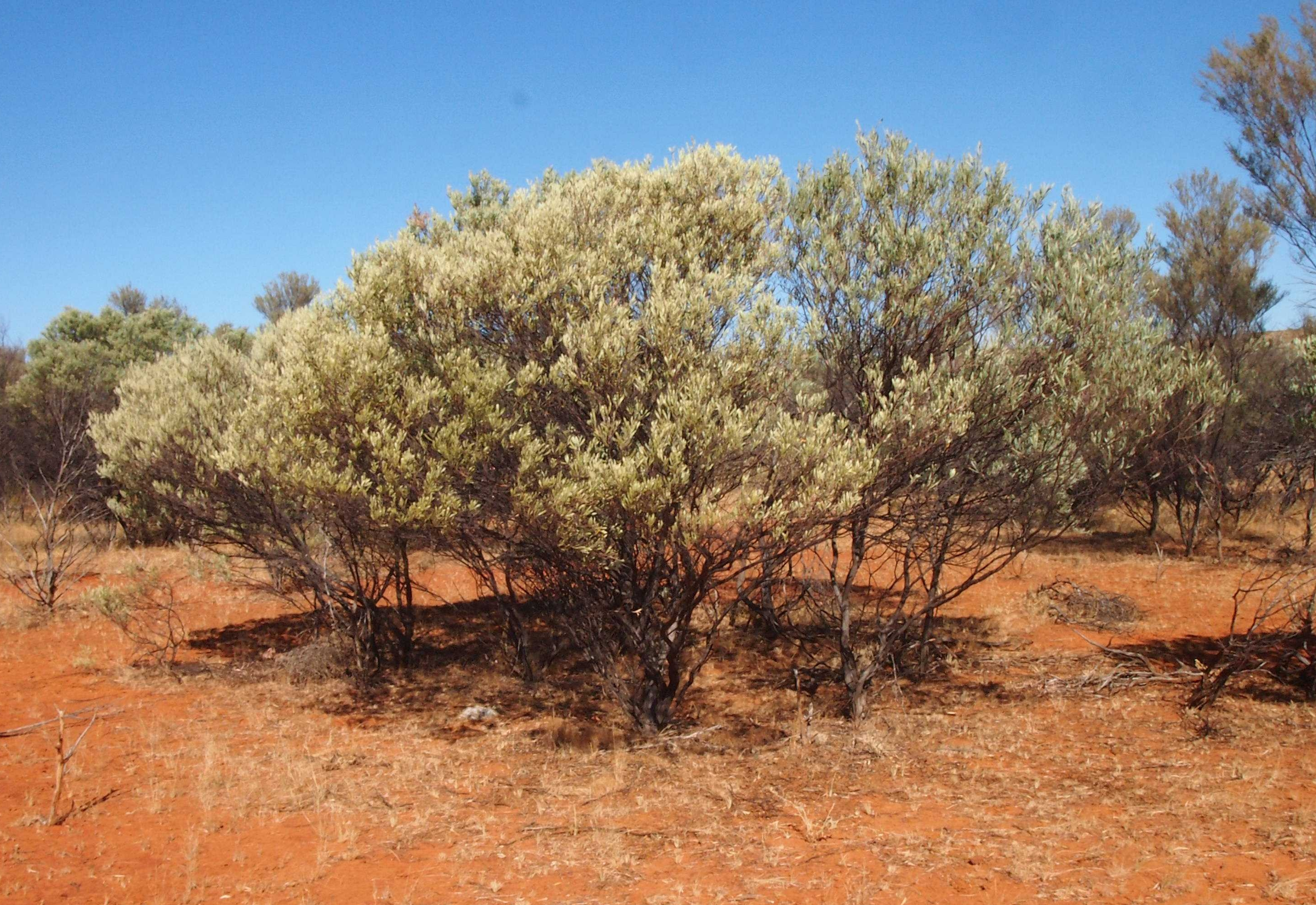

Conservation status
- Least Concern (IUCN 3.1)

Scientific classification
- Kingdom: Plantae
- Clade: Tracheophytes
- Clade: Angiosperms
- Clade: Eudicots
- Clade: Rosids
- Order: Fabales
- Family: Fabaceae
- Subfamily: Caesalpinioideae
- Clade: Mimosoid clade
- Genus: Acacia
- Species: A. cuthbertsonii

Binomial name
- Acacia cuthbertsonii Luehm.
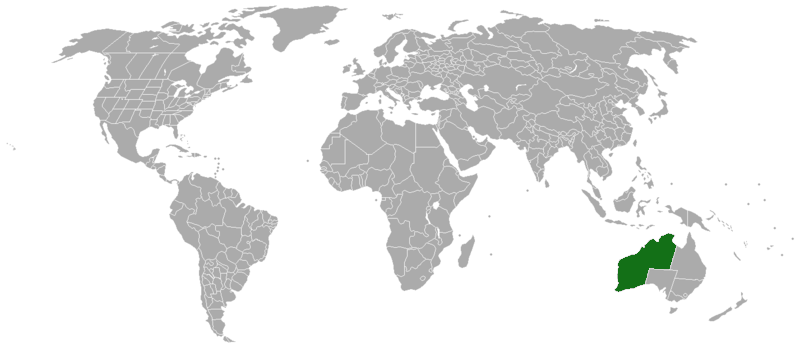
- Range of Acacia cuthbertsonii

Synonyms
- Acacia cuthbertsoni Luehm. orth. var.; Racosperma cuthbertsonii (Luehm.) Pedley

= Acacia cuthbertsonii =

Species of legume

Acacia cuthbertsonii, commonly known as silver witchetty or pirli, is a species of flowering plant in the family Fabaceae and is native to the north of Western Australia and the Northern Territory. It is a bushy, often gnarled shrub or tree with silky hairy branchlets, elliptic to narrowly elliptic or linear phyllodes, spikes of golden yellow flowers and narrowly oblong to linear, curved, woody pods.

== Description ==
Acacia cuthbertsonii is a bushy, often gnarled shrub or tree that typically grows to a height of 1–4 m (3 ft 3 in – 13 ft 1 in) and has silky, silvery hairs on the branchlets. Its phyllodes are elliptic to narrowly elliptic or linear, straight to curved, flat to compressed, 30–110 mm (1.2–4.3 in) long and 1–20 mm (0.039–0.787 in) wide. There are up to three glands, the lowest gland 3–28 mm (0.12–1.10 in) above the base of the phyllodes. The flowers are golden yellow and borne on two spikes 10–34 mm (0.39–1.34 in) long and 3–4 mm (0.12–0.16 in) wide on peduncles 2–11 mm (0.079–0.433 in) long. Flowering time depends on subspecies, and the pods are narrowly oblong to linear, mostly slightly to markedly curved, up to 140 mm (5.5 in) long and 11–22 mm (0.43–0.87 in) wide, glabrous and woody. The seeds are broadly elliptic to more or less round, dull brown, 7.5–9 mm (0.30–0.35 in) long with a small aril on the end.

== Taxonomy ==
Acacia cuthbertsonii was first formally described in 1897 by Johann George Luehmann in the Victorian Naturalist from specimens collected between the Murchison and Gascoyne Rivers by Walter Cuthbertson and near Mount Narryer by Isaac Tyson.

In 1995, Richard Cowan and Bruce Maslin described two subspecies of A. cuthbertsonii and the names are accepted by the Australian Plant Census:

- Acacia cuthbertsonii Luehm. subsp. cuthbertsonii has elliptic to narrowly elliptic to linear phyllodes 3–10 mm (0.12–0.39 in) or more long, and flowers in most months of the year.
- Acacia cuthbertsonii subsp. linearis R.S.Cowan & Maslin has narrowly linear phyllodes 1.0–1.5 mm (0.039–0.059 in) and flowers recorded from October to December.

== Distribution and habitat ==
The species is found in drier areas of Western Australia and the Northern Territory, where it grows in a variety of situations including on stony rises, gibber plains, and along creeks and drainage lines in stony sandy or loamy soils.

- Subspecies cuthbertsonii is widespread from inland of Shark Bay and Kalbarri to east of Tennant Creek in the Northern Territory.
- Subspecies linearis occurs inland from the southern end of Shark Bay and east to Meekatharra and Bulloo Downs Station.

== Conservation status ==
Both subspecies of Acacia cuthbertsonii are listed as by the Government of Western Australia Department of Biodiversity, Conservation and Attractions.

== Uses ==
The plant is used as an analgesic, in particular, for headaches and toothaches, by Aboriginal Australians of the Northern Territory. The wood is used to make splints to treat bone fractures. Certain parts of the tree are used to make bandages.

== See also ==
- List of Acacia species
