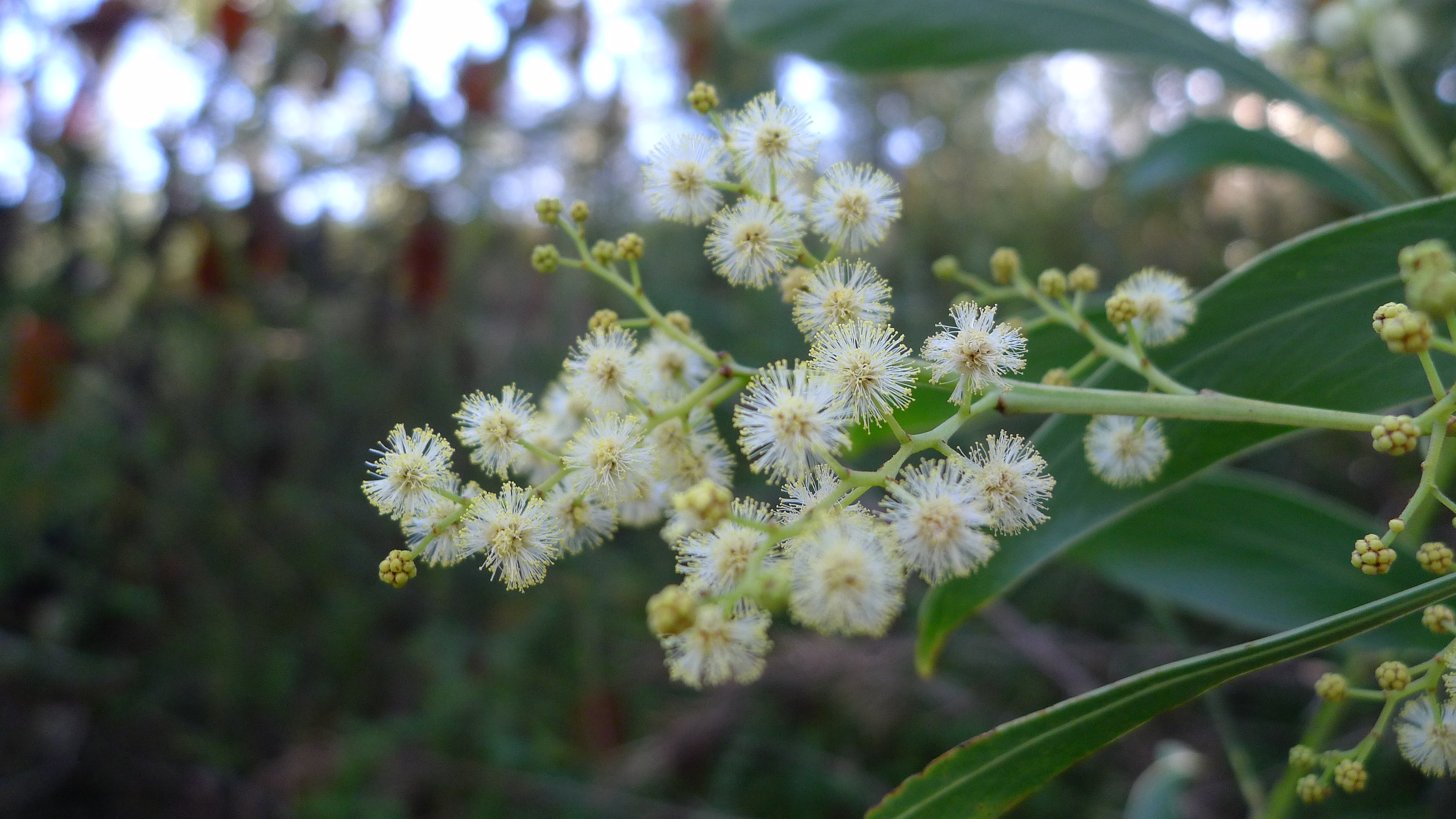
- In the Royal National Park

Scientific classification
- Kingdom: Plantae
- Clade: Embryophytes
- Clade: Tracheophytes
- Clade: Spermatophytes
- Clade: Angiosperms
- Clade: Eudicots
- Clade: Rosids
- Order: Fabales
- Family: Fabaceae
- Subfamily: Caesalpinioideae
- Clade: Mimosoid clade
- Genus: Acacia
- Species: A. falcata

Binomial name
- Acacia falcata Willd.

Synonyms
- Acacia ensifolia Steud. nom. inval., pro syn.; Acacia falcata Sieber ex Steud. nom. inval., pro syn.; Acacia falcata Willd. var. falcata; Acacia obliqua Desv.; Acacia plagiophylla Spreng.; Mimosa falcata (Willd.) Poir. nom. illeg.; Mimosa obliqua J.C.Wendl. nom. illeg.; Mimosa obliqua Pers. nom. illeg.; Racosperma falcatum (Willd.) Pedley

= Acacia falcata =

Sickle wattle

Species of legume

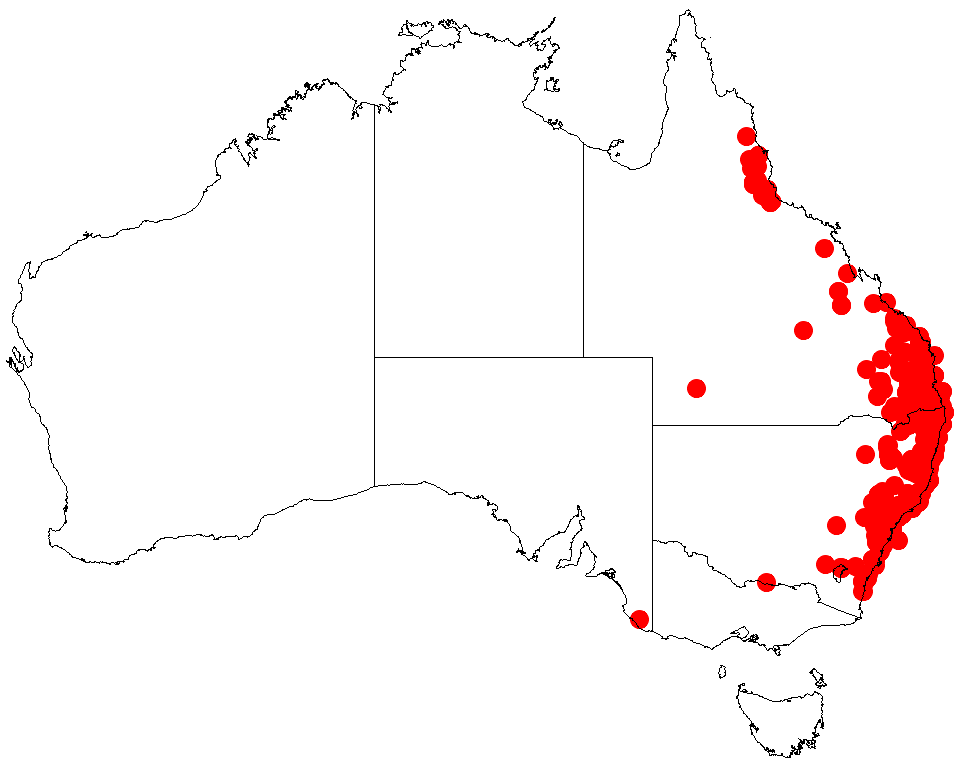
Distribution map of Acacia falcata

Acacia falcata, commonly known as burra, sickle-shaped acacia, sally, hickory wattle or silver-leaved wattle, is a species of flowering plant in the family Fabaceae and is endemic to eastern Australia. It is an erect, slender shrub or tree with red-brown, glabrous branchlets, sickle-shaped phyllodes, spherical heads of creamy white flowers and linear, leathery pods.

== Description ==
Acacia falcata is an erect, slender shrub or tree that typically grows to a height of 2–5 m (6 ft 7 in – 16 ft 5 in) and has smooth or finely fissured bark and branchlets that are red-brown, glabrous and often covered with a whitish bloom. Its phyllodes are sickle-shaped, broadest above the middle and narrowed at the base, 70–190 mm (2.8–7.5 in) long, 10–40 mm (0.39–1.57 in) wide and thin, greyish green to glaucous with an excentric midrib. The flowers are borne in spherical heads in racemes usually 20–60 mm (0.79–2.36 in) long on a peduncle 3–4 mm (0.12–0.16 in) long, each head with 15 to 20 creamy white flowers. Flowering occurs from April to August, and the pods are linear, straight to slightly curved, up to 120 mm (4.7 in) long and 5–8 mm (0.20–0.31 in) wide, firmly leathery, blackish and glabrous, often with a thin powdery coating. The seeds are oblong to egg-shaped, 3.5–4.5 mm (0.14–0.18 in) long, black and somewhat shiny with a club-shaped aril.

== Taxonomy ==
Acacia falcata was first formally described in 1806 by German botanist Carl Ludwig Willdenow in Species Plantarum. The specific epithet (falcata) means 'falcate' or 'shaped like a scythe or sickle'.

In 1798, Johann Christoph Wendland described the species as Mimosa obliqua in Botanische Beobachtungen, but that name was illegitimate because it had already been given to a different taxon.

== Distribution and habitat ==
Burra is found in coastal regions and on the eastern slopes of the Great Dividing Range from Bundaberg, Herberton and Ingham in Queensland and south through eastern New South Wales to Narooma. It is common in the understorey of Eucalyptus communities, often in shallow, stony soil. It grows predominantly on shale soils in open forest, and is associated with such trees as Eucalyptus paniculata, E. longifolia and E. tereticornis.

This species of wattle has been introduced to Java, Indonesia.

== Ecology ==
Plants live for five to twenty years in the wild, and are killed by bushfire. The seed is released in December, and dispersed by wind. It is stored in the soil, although it is unclear how related germination is to bushfire. Seed can germinate in disturbed areas.

Acacia falcata is the host plant for the imperial hairstreak (Jalmenus evagoras). One field study recovered 98 species of bug (Hemiptera) from A. falcata across its range.

== Uses ==
=== Use in horticulture ===
Acacia falcata is adaptable to a wide range of soils in cultivation, and its attractive foliage is a horticultural feature. It is propagated by seed which must be pretreated with boiling water before it is able to germinate. It is easy to grow given a good sunlit position and good drainage, and is used in revegetation.

=== Indigenous uses ===
Australian indigenous people use the bark to make a liniment for treating ailments of the skin. A. falcata is excellent for stabilizing barren sand. The bark is important in the tanning industry.

The 1889 book The Useful Native Plants of Australia records that common names included 'hickory' and 'sally' and that Indigenous Australians of the Cumberland and Camden areas of New South Wales referred to it as Weetjellan. It also notes that "This bark, which contains much tannin, was used by the Aboriginals [sic] of the counties of Cumberland and Camden to stupefy fish, and to make embrocations for the cure of cutaneous diseases."

== Gallery ==
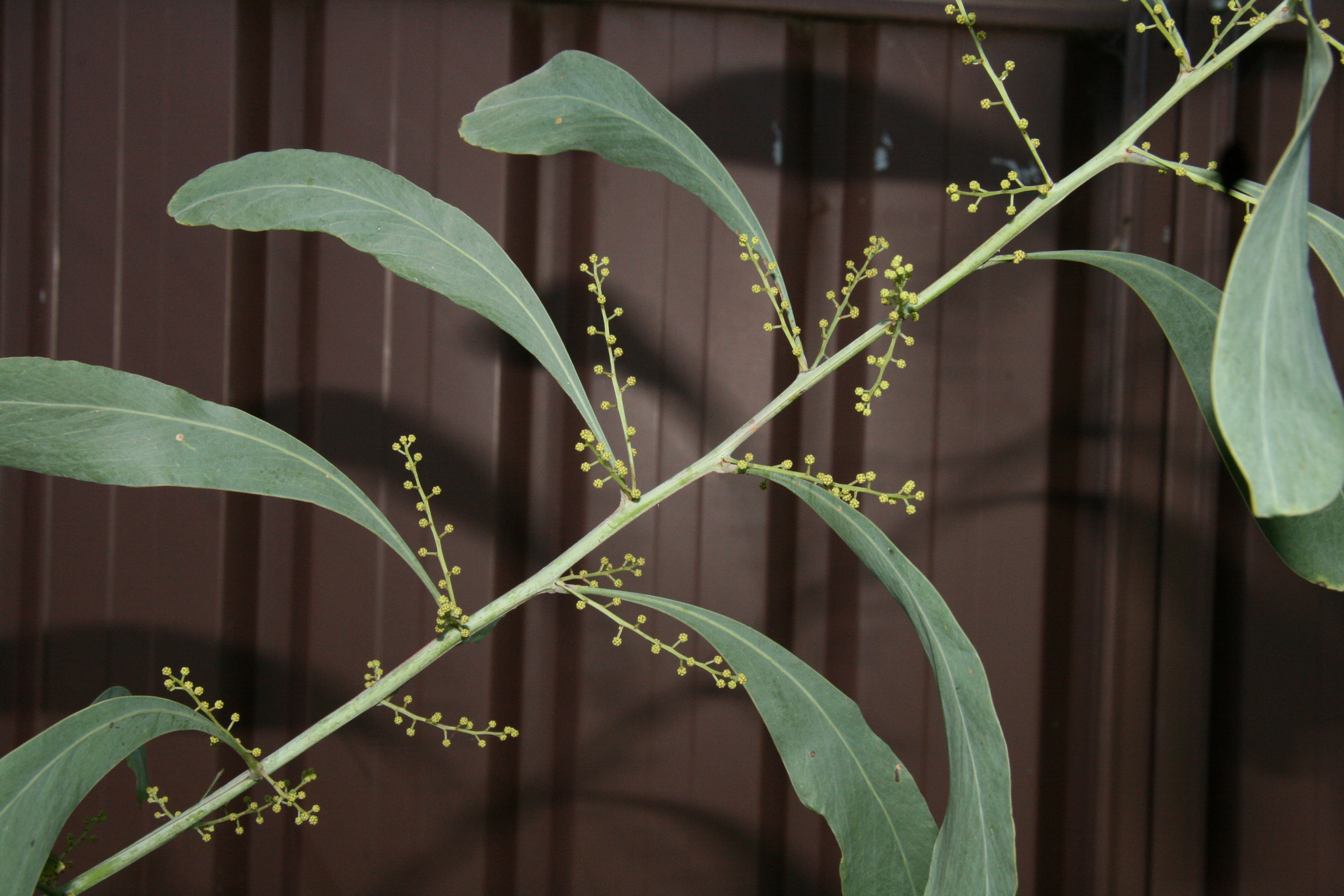
Leaves and developing buds

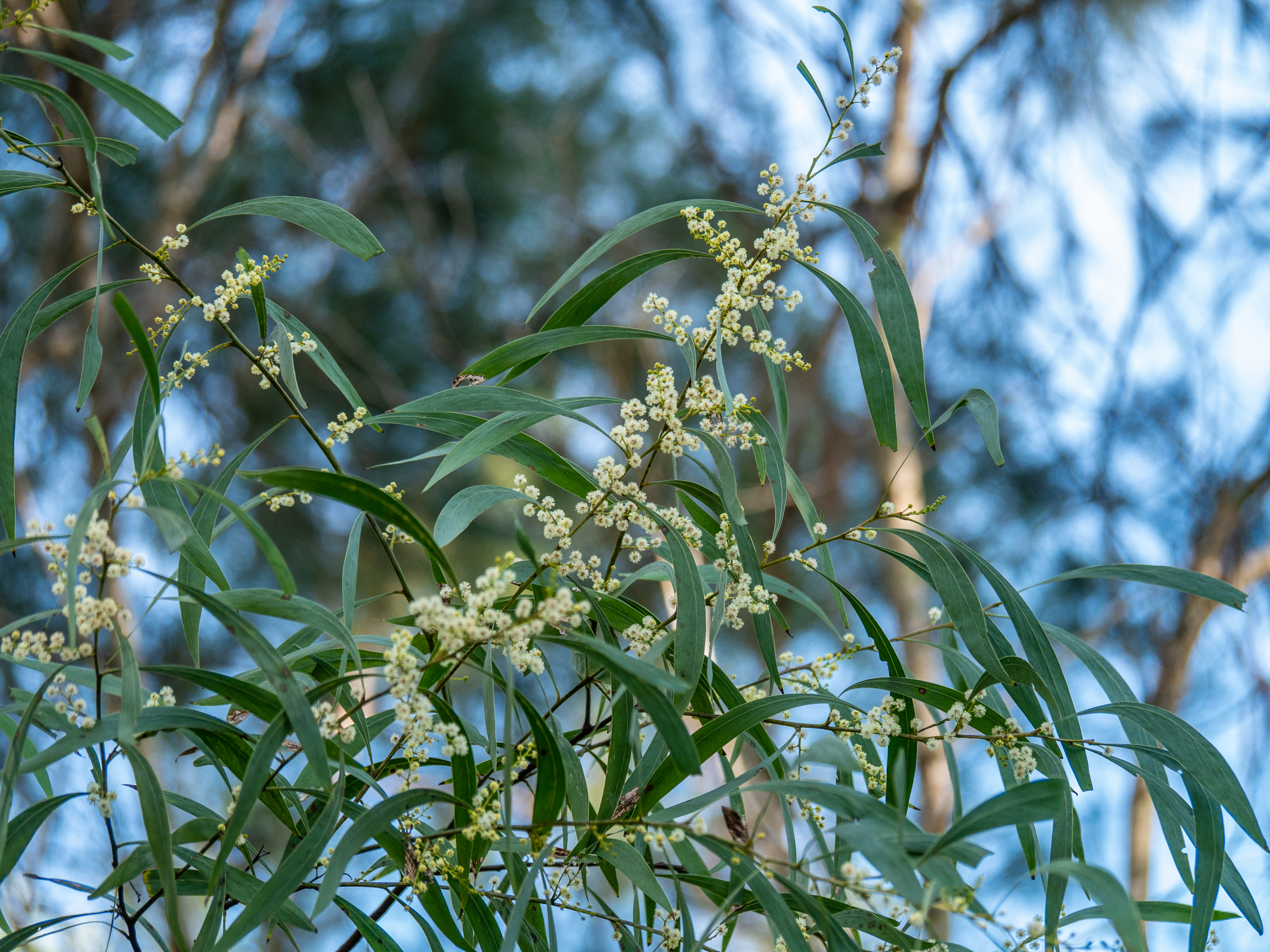
Inflorescences

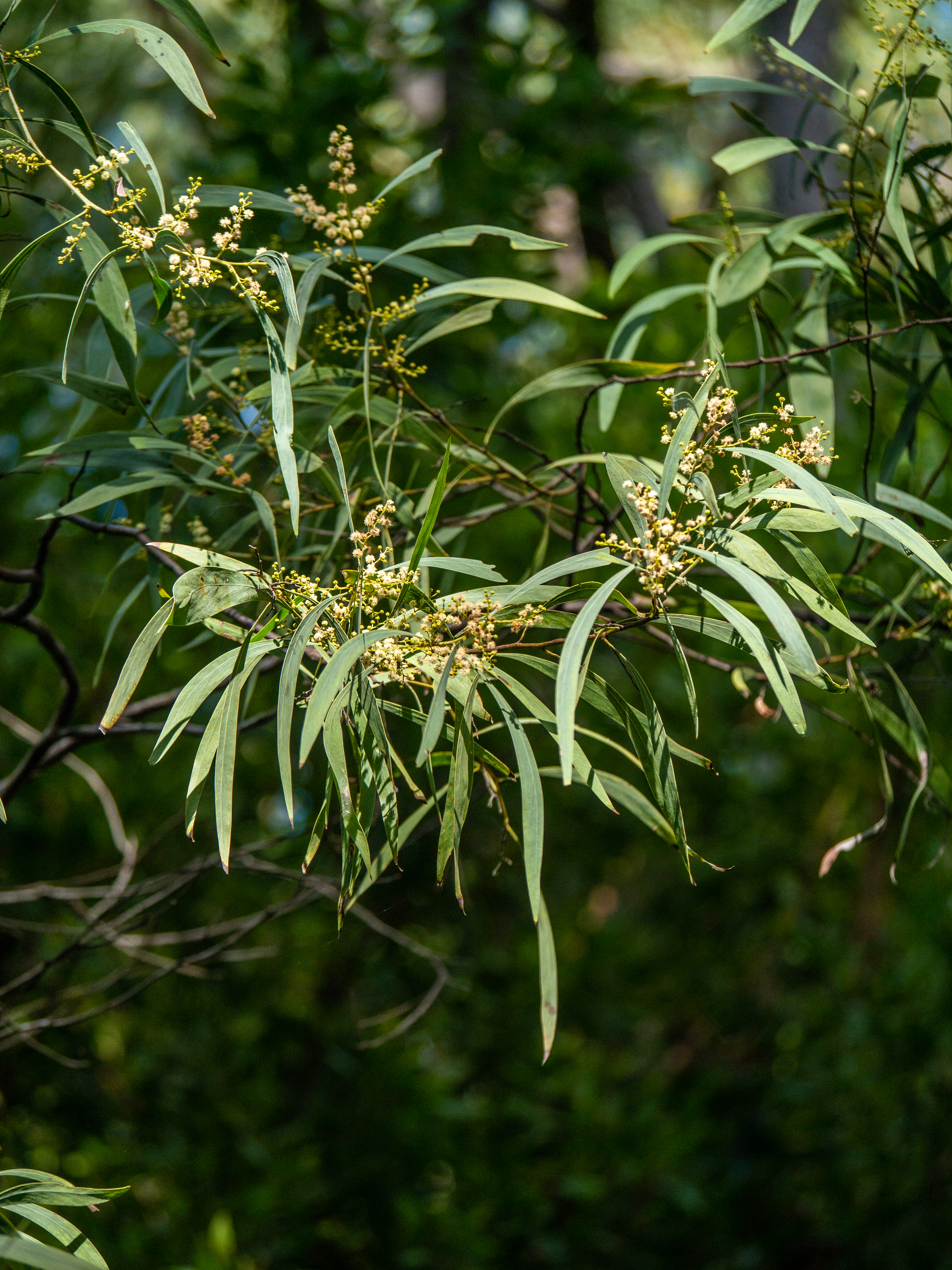
Inflorescences

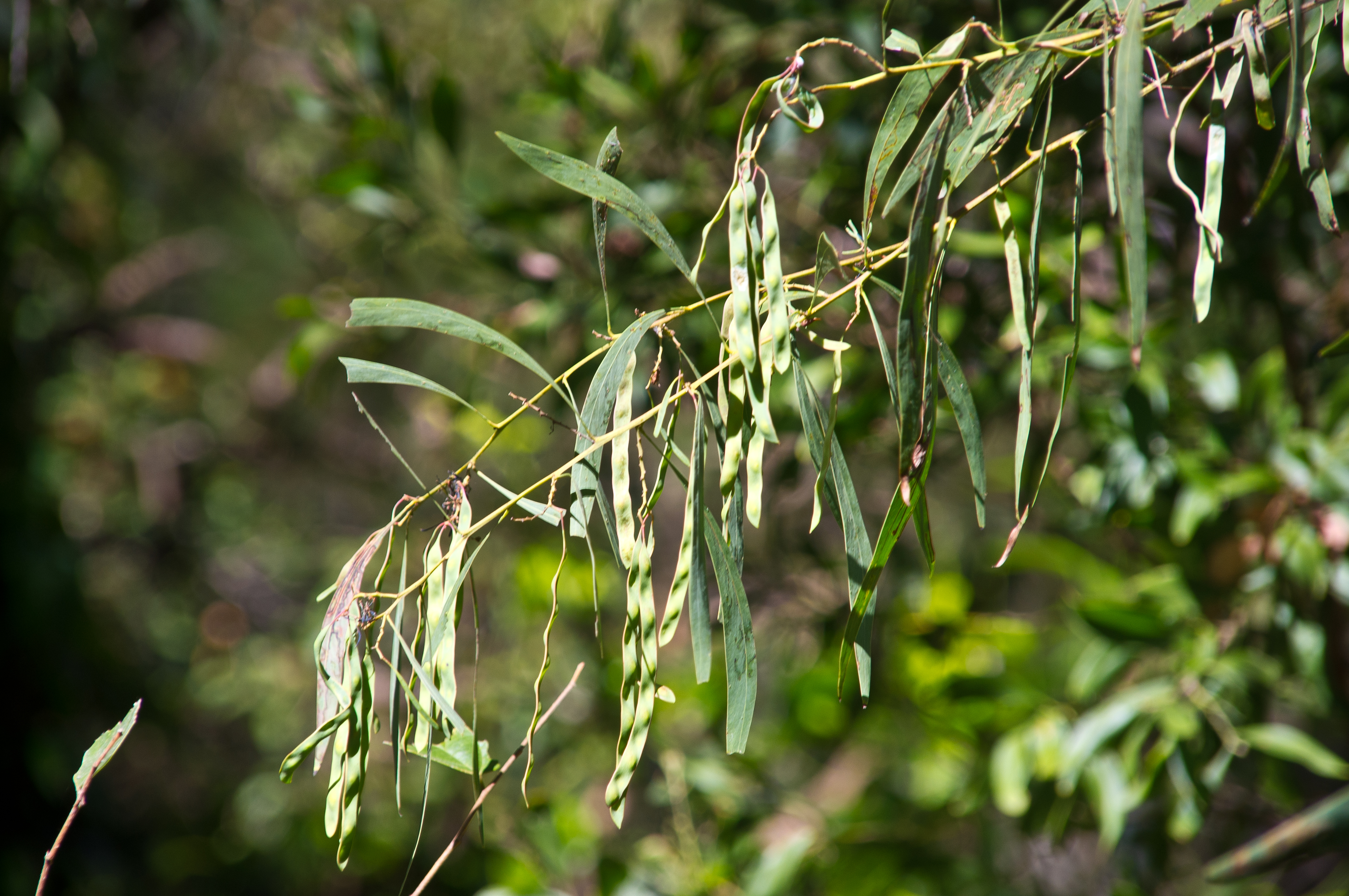
Pods

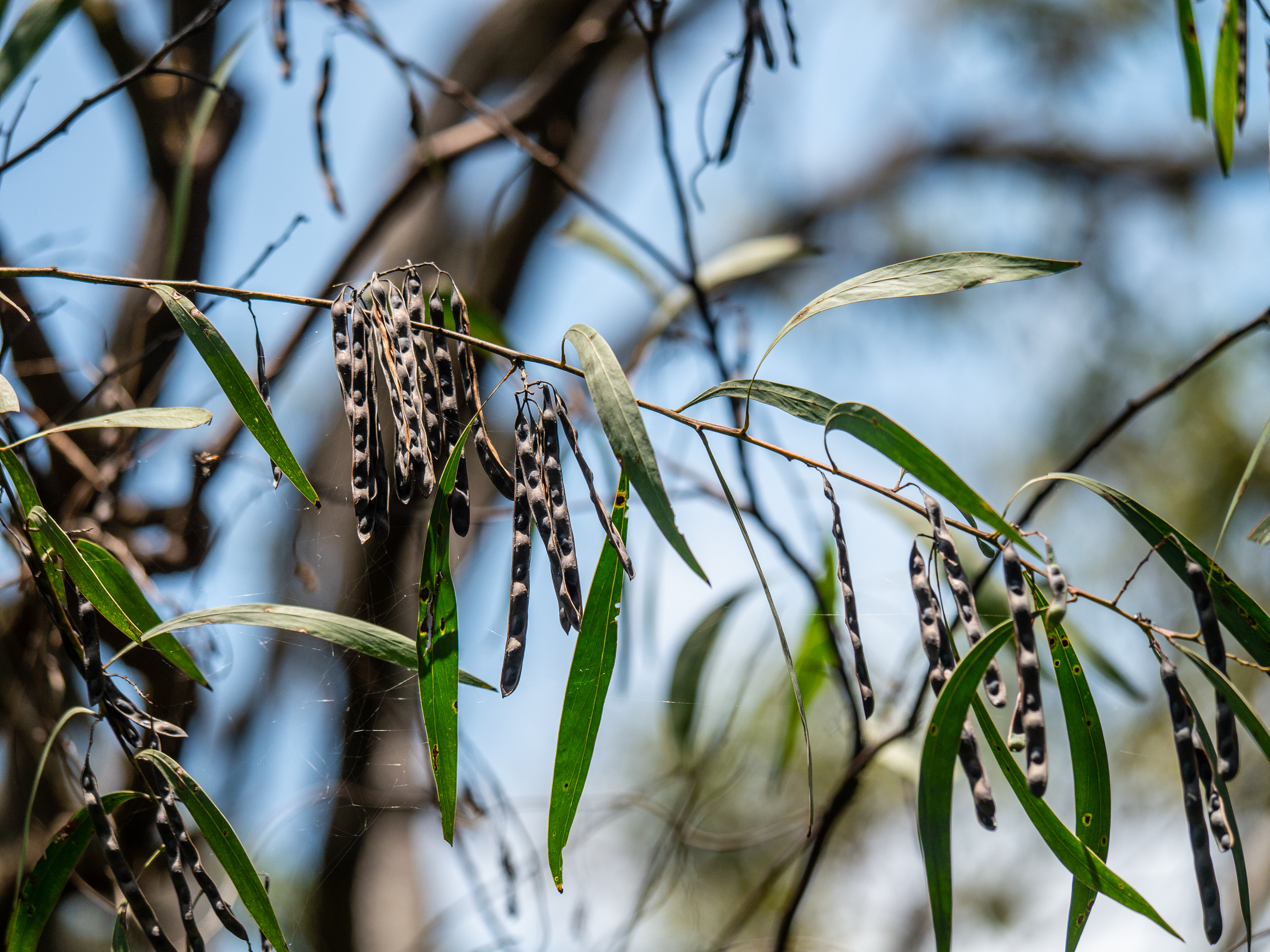
Pods
