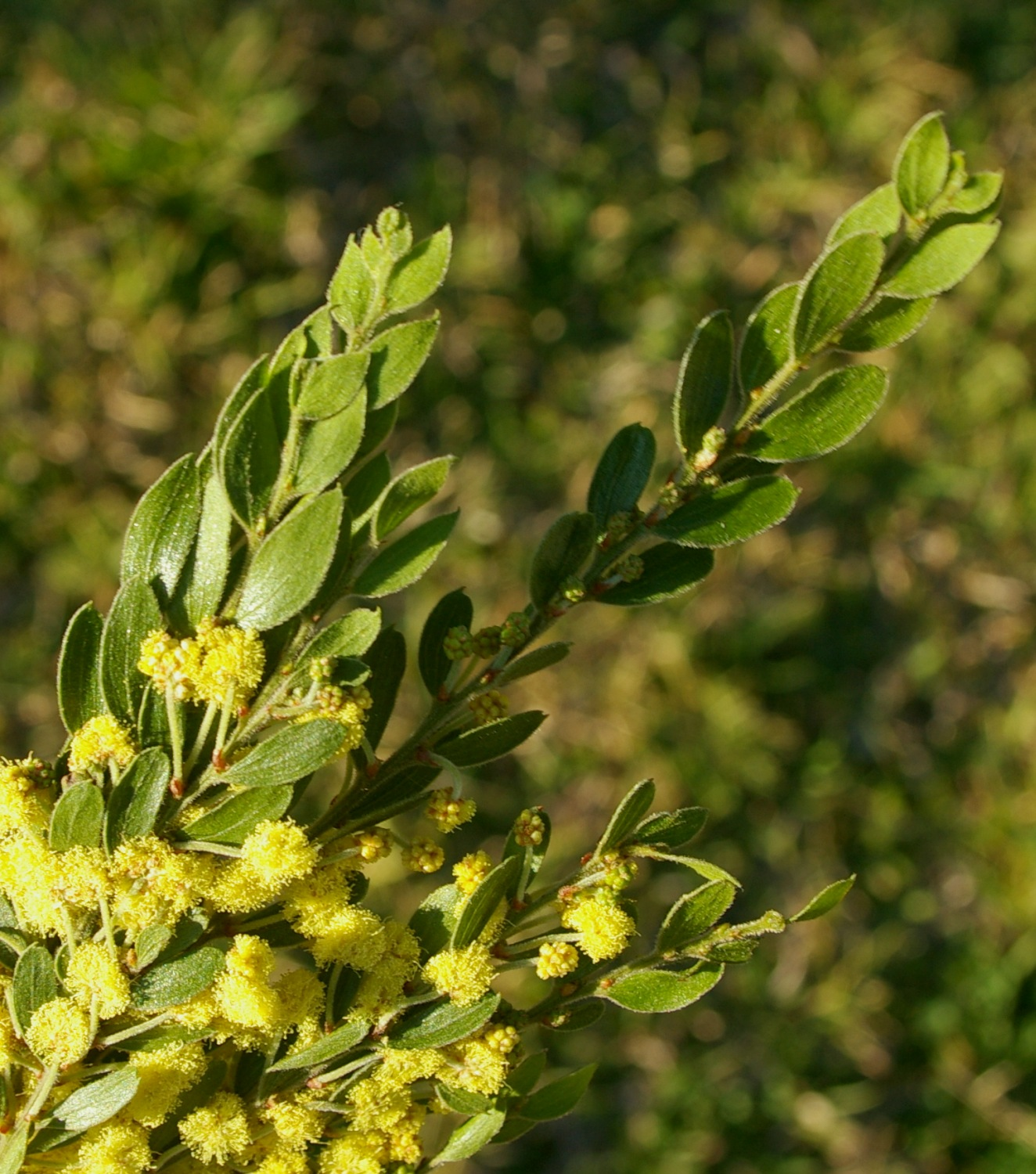
- In the Wagga Wagga Botanic Gardens

Scientific classification
- Kingdom: Plantae
- Clade: Embryophytes
- Clade: Tracheophytes
- Clade: Spermatophytes
- Clade: Angiosperms
- Clade: Eudicots
- Clade: Rosids
- Order: Fabales
- Family: Fabaceae
- Subfamily: Caesalpinioideae
- Clade: Mimosoid clade
- Genus: Acacia
- Species: A. vestita

Binomial name
- Acacia vestita Ker Gawl.
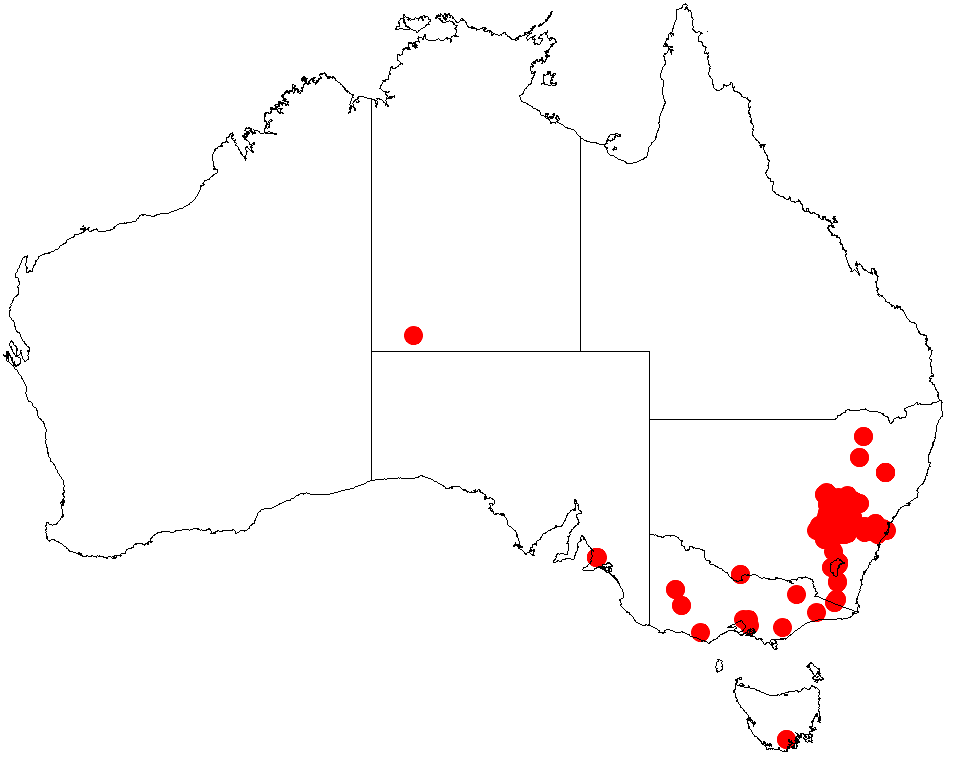
- Occurrence data from AVH

= Acacia vestita =

Species of legume

Acacia vestita, also known as weeping boree, weeping acacia, and hairy wattle, is a shrub and small tree native to New South Wales, Australia.

== Description ==
The tree grows about 3 metres (9.8 ft) tall and 3 metres in diameter. It bears flowers from about August to October and can be propagated by seed, sometimes requiring soaking in hot water first to permeate the hard seed layer before putting it in the ground.
