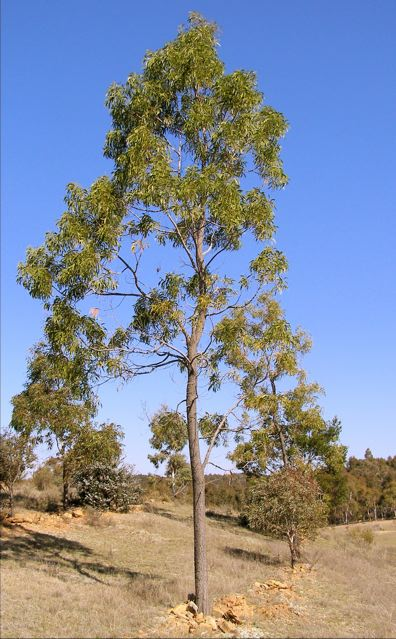

Scientific classification
- Kingdom: Plantae
- Clade: Embryophytes
- Clade: Tracheophytes
- Clade: Spermatophytes
- Clade: Angiosperms
- Clade: Eudicots
- Clade: Rosids
- Order: Fabales
- Family: Fabaceae
- Subfamily: Caesalpinioideae
- Clade: Mimosoid clade
- Genus: Acacia
- Species: A. implexa

Binomial name
- Acacia implexa Benth.
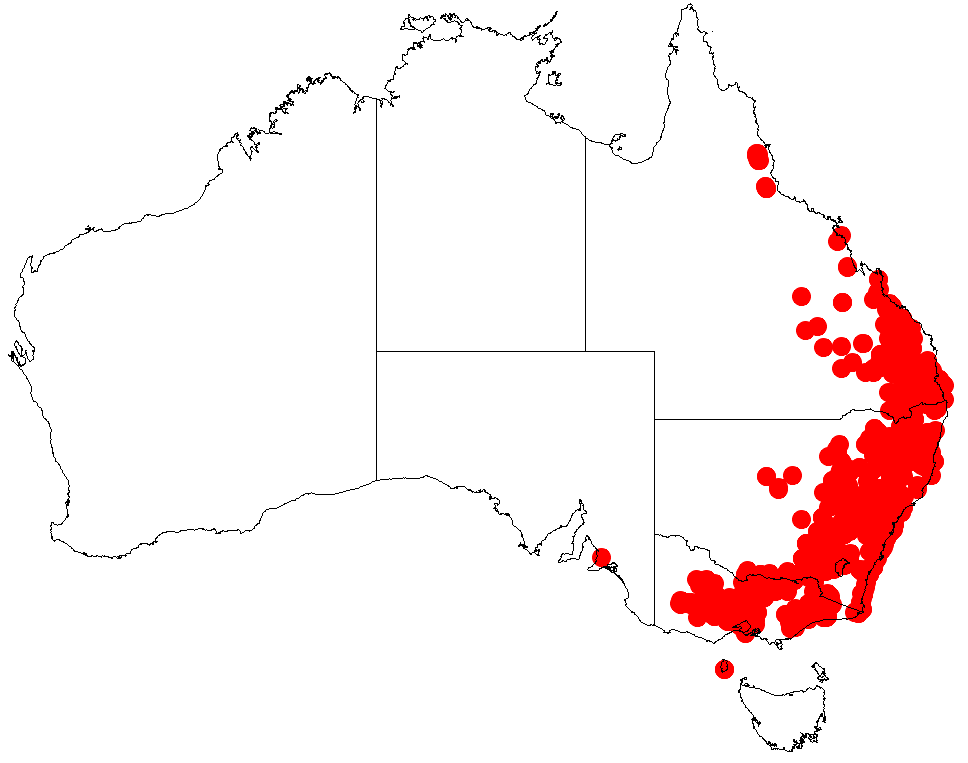
- Occurrence data from AVH

Synonyms
- Acacia implexa Benth. var. implexa Racosperma implexum (Benth.) Pedley

= Acacia implexa =

Lightwood

Species of plant

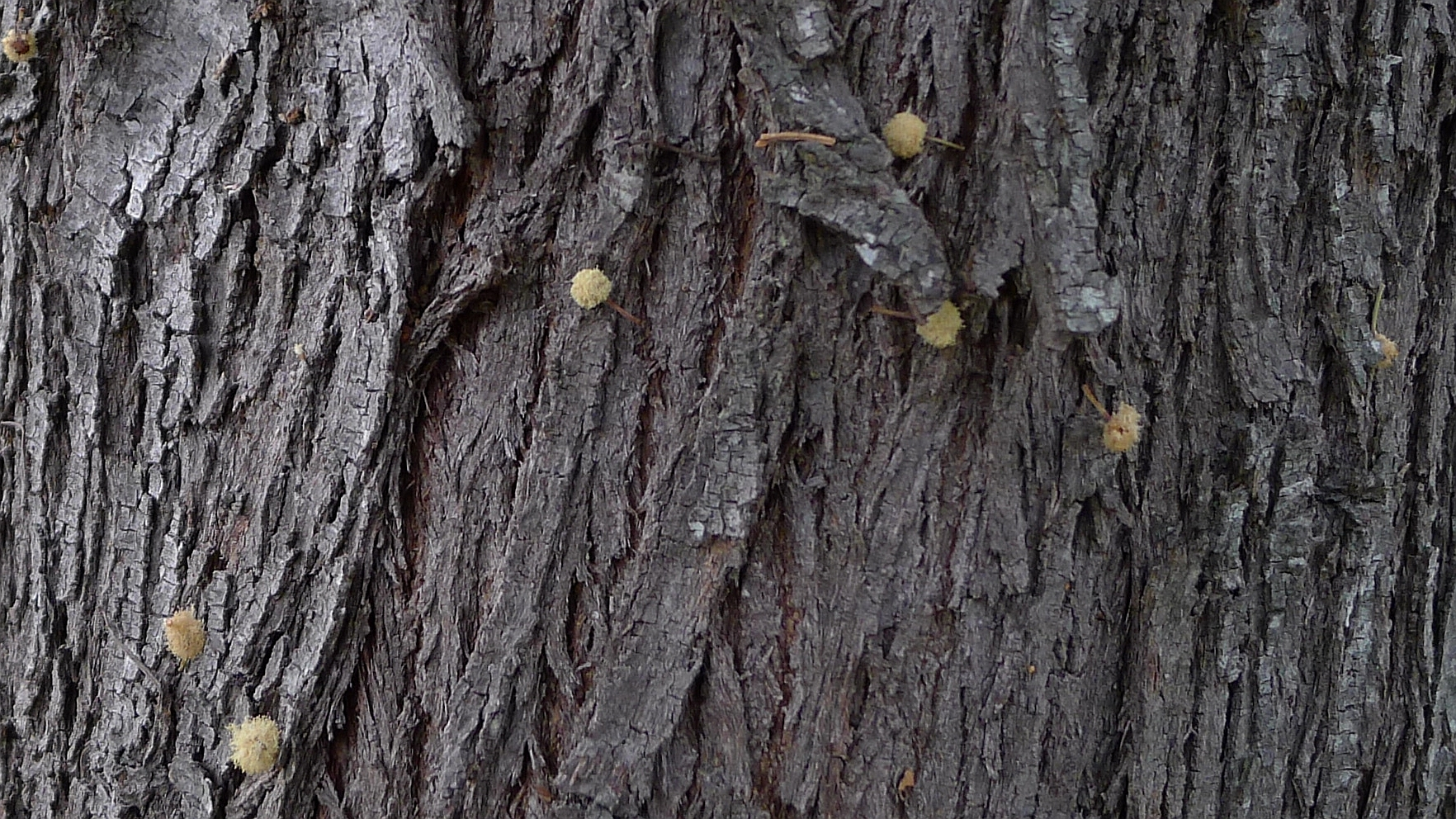
Lightwood bark

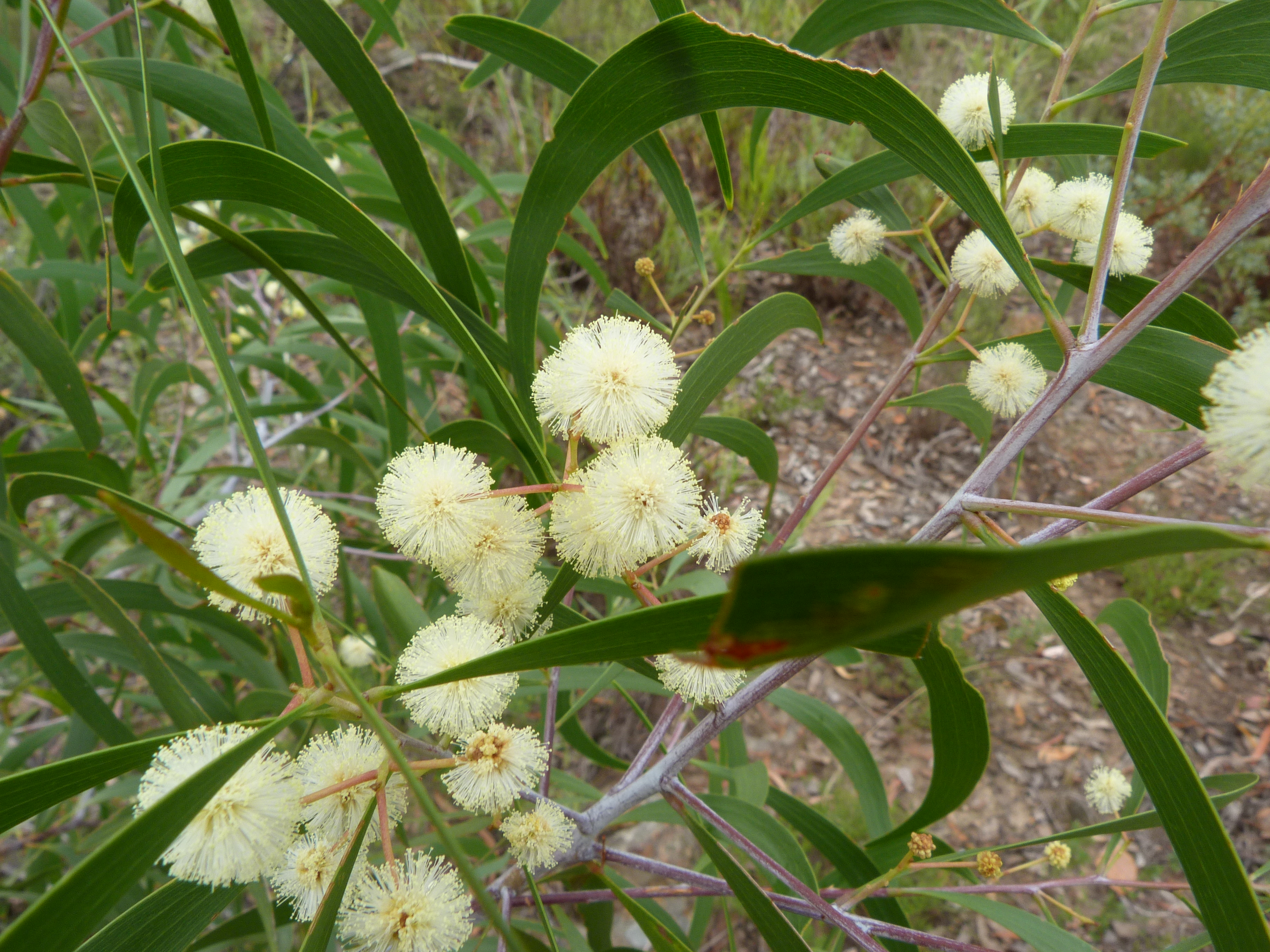
Acacia implexa flowers

Acacia implexa, commonly known as lightwood or hickory wattle, is a fast-growing Australian tree, the timber of which is used for furniture making. The wood is prized for its finish and strength. The foliage was used to make pulp and dye cloth.

== Description ==
Acacia implexa is a long-lived small to medium-sized tree with an upright habit and an open crown that typically grows to a height of 5 to 15 m (16 to 49 ft) and a width of 4 to 10 m (13 to 33 ft). The tree can have a single or multiple stems with rough greyish bark. The branchlets are commonly lightly covered in waxy bloom but are not prominently ribbed. It has light green, slender sickle-shaped phyllodes that have a length of up to 20 cm (7.9 in) and a width of 6 to 25 mm (0.24 to 0.98 in). The phyllodes have three to seven prominent nerves and many other fainter ones that are parallel and branching. Bipinnate leaves may persist on some plants. Young foliage has a purple colour in certain conditions. It blooms in summer and produces spherical cream-coloured flowers with a strong perfume. The flower heads have a diameter of 5 to 6 mm (0.20 to 0.24 in) and contain 30 to 52 cream to pale yellow flowers. After flowering, thick woody seed pods with a linear and twisted to coiled shape form with a length of 25 cm (9.8 in) and a width of 4 to 7 mm (0.16 to 0.28 in).

Dust from the pods can irritate the eyes and nose. It has wood similar to and is often mistaken with Acacia melanoxylon.

== Taxonomy and naming ==
Acacia implexa was first formally described by the botanist George Bentham in 1842 in Hooker's London Journal of Botany from specimens collected in the "ravines of the Shoalhaven River" by Allan Cunningham. The specific epithet (implexa) means 'entangled' or 'entwined', referring to the twisted and tangled pods.

The Wiradjuri people of New South Wales use the name Gidya.

== Distribution and habitat ==
It is widespread in eastern Australia from central coastal Queensland to southern Victoria, with outlying populations on the Atherton Tableland in northern Queensland and Tasmania's King Island. The tree is commonly found on fertile plains and in hilly country, where it is usually part of open forest communities and grows in shallow, drier sandy and clay soils.

== Aboriginal uses ==
The Ngunnawal people of the ACT used the bark to make rope, string, medicine and fish poison, the timber for tools, and the seeds to make flour. The Dharawal people used the flowering of Acacia implexa as a seasonal indicator that fires should not be lit unless they are on sand, and camping near creeks and rivers is avoided during this time. The Wiradjuri people of New South Wales use the seeds to make flour, and the bark as a medicine, and for fish poison.

== Use in horticulture ==
For Acacia implexa to grow, its seeds must first be scarified to crack open the outer casing of the seed which encourages germination. It should start to germinate within two weeks of scarification and being buried in suitable soil.

The species is very hardy and suitable for soil stabilization and bank planting, as a result of the plants suckering habit, which can be accelerated if the roots are damaged. It handles full sun well and is drought and frost tolerant to a temperature of −7 °C (19 °F). It is very prone to leaf gall.

== See also ==
- List of Acacia species
