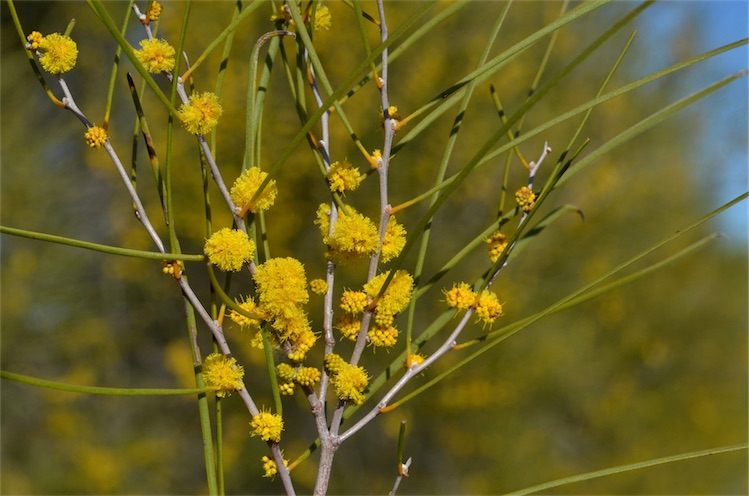
- In the Gawler Ranges National Park

Scientific classification
- Kingdom: Plantae
- Clade: Tracheophytes
- Clade: Angiosperms
- Clade: Eudicots
- Clade: Rosids
- Order: Fabales
- Family: Fabaceae
- Subfamily: Caesalpinioideae
- Clade: Mimosoid clade
- Genus: Acacia
- Species: A. burkittii

Binomial name
- Acacia burkittii F.Muell. ex Benth.

Synonyms
- List: Acacia acuminata subsp. burkittii (F.Muell. ex Benth.) Kodela & Tindale; Acacia randeliana Jessop orth. var.; Acacia randelliana W.Fitzg.; Racosperma burkittii (F.Muell. ex Benth.) Pedley

= Acacia burkittii =

Burkitt's wattle

Species of legume

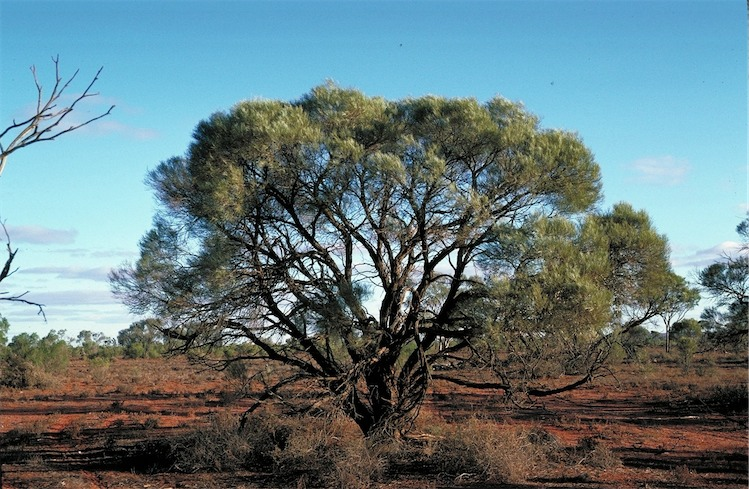
Habit near Mutawintji

Acacia burkittii, Burkitt's wattle, gunderbluey, pin bush, sandhill wattle and fine leaf jam, is a species of flowering plant in the family Fabaceae and is endemic to arid parts of southern continental Australia. It is a shrub or tree, usually with many stems, erect, linear to thread-like phyllodes, oblong to cylindrical spike of golden-yellow flowers and firmly papery pods appearing like a string of beads.

== Description ==
Acacia burkittii is a shrub or tree that typically grows to a height of 1.5–5 m (4 ft 11 in – 16 ft 5 in) and usually has many stems. The bark on the main trunks is fissured and dark brown. Its phyllodes are upright to erect, linear to thread-like, mostly 60–130 mm (2.4–5.1 in) long and 0.7–1.5 mm (0.028–0.059 in) wide, cylindrical to four-sided in cross section. There is a curved, pointed but not sharp, tip on the end of the phyllodes. The flowers are golden yellow and arranged in one or two sessile, oblong to cylindrical spikes in axils, and are 5–10 mm (0.20–0.39 in) long. Flowering mainly occurs from July to October, and the pods are firmly papery to thinly leathery and glabrous, 40–80 mm (1.6–3.1 in) long and 4–5 mm (0.16–0.20 in) wide, appearing more or less like a string of beads, containing spherical or oblong seeds 3.5–5 mm (0.14–0.20 in) long and 3–4.5 mm (0.12–0.18 in) wide with a white aril.

== Taxonomy ==
Acacia burkittii was first formally described in 1864 by George Bentham in his Flora Australiensis from an unpublished description by Ferdinand von Mueller of a specimen collected by "Burkitt" near Lake Gilles. The specific epithet (burkittii) honours one of at least five people called 'Burkitt' who collected for von Mueller, mainly in South Australia.

== Distribution and habitat ==
Burkitt's wattle grows in a variety of soils in mallee, eucalypt and mulga, often on sandhills in the Avon Wheatbelt, Central Ranges, Coolgardie, Gascoyne, Geraldton Sandplains, Gibson Desert, Great Victoria Desert, Little Sandy Desert, Mallee, Murchison, Nullarbor and Yalgoo bioregions of Western Australia, the south of South Australia and the western slopes and plains of New South Wales. It has also been introduced into India.
