= List of Acacia species used for tannin production =

This is a list of Acacia species (sensu lato) that are used for the production of tannins.

Tannin Content of Various Acacia Species
	Bark	Dried Leaves	Seed Pods
Species	Tannins [%]	Tannins [%]	Tannins [%]
Acacia albida	2-28%		5-13%
Acacia cavenia			32%
Acacia dealbata	19.1%		
Acacia decurrens	37-40%		
Acacia farnesiana			23%
Acacia mearnsii	25-35%		
Acacia melanoxylon	20%		
Acacia nilotica	18-23%*		
Acacia penninervis	18%		
Acacia pycnantha	30-45%	15-16%	
Acacia saligna	21.5%		
Notes: * - Inner bark
