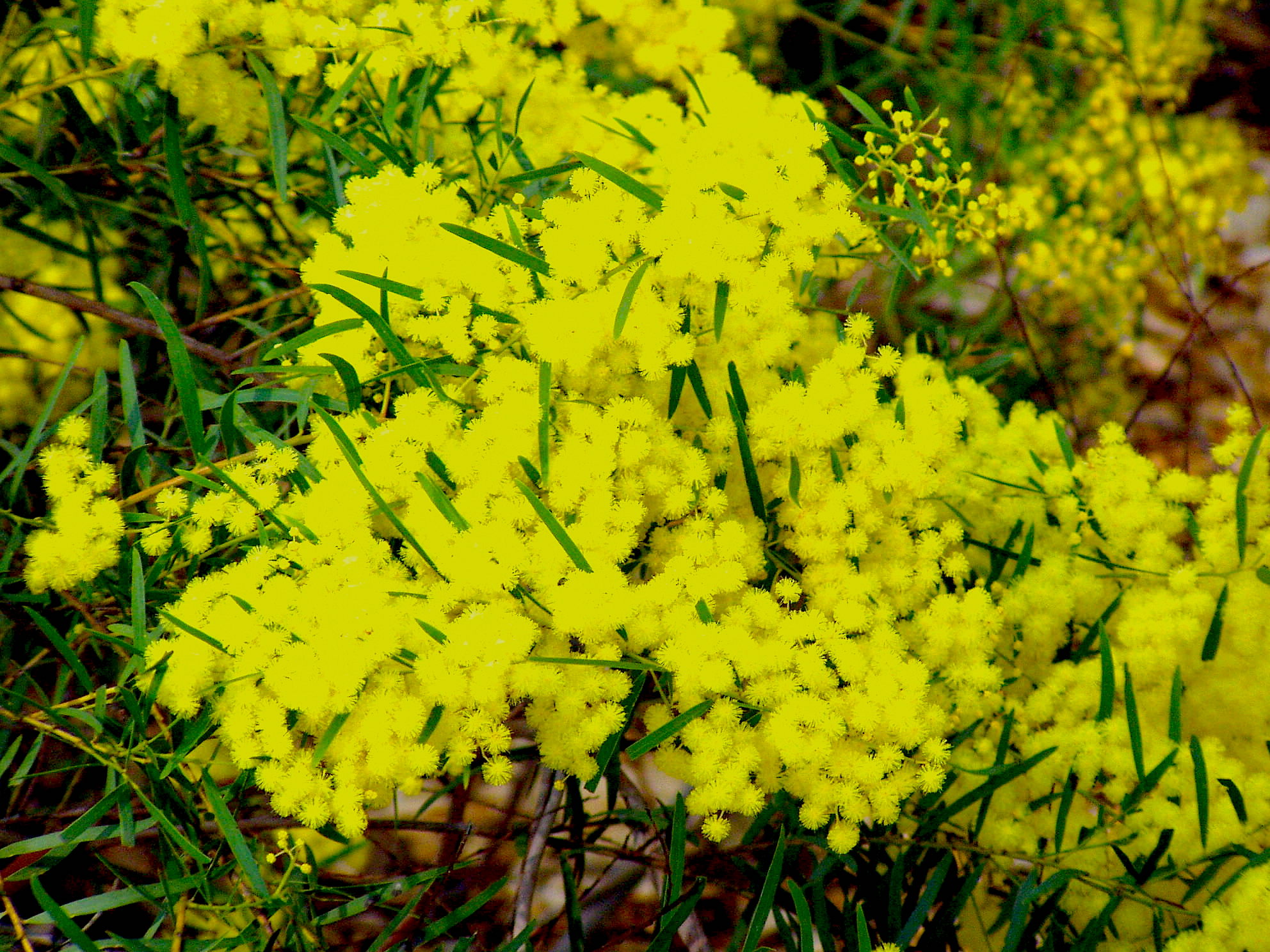

Scientific classification
- Kingdom: Plantae
- Clade: Embryophytes
- Clade: Tracheophytes
- Clade: Spermatophytes
- Clade: Angiosperms
- Clade: Eudicots
- Clade: Rosids
- Order: Fabales
- Family: Fabaceae
- Subfamily: Caesalpinioideae
- Clade: Mimosoid clade
- Genus: Acacia
- Species: A. fimbriata

Binomial name
- Acacia fimbriata A.Cunn. ex G.Don

Synonyms
- List: Acacia fimbriata A.Cunn. ex G.Don var. fimbriata; Acacia fimbriata var. glabra C.T.White; Acacia fimbriata var. perangusta C.T.White; Acacia perangusta (C.T.White) Pedley; Acacia prominens var. ? whiteana Domin; Acacia prominens var. fimbriata (A.Cunn. ex G.Don) Domin; Racosperma fimbriatum (G.Don) Pedley; Racosperma perangustum (C.T.White) Pedley

= Acacia fimbriata =

Fringed wattle

Species of legume

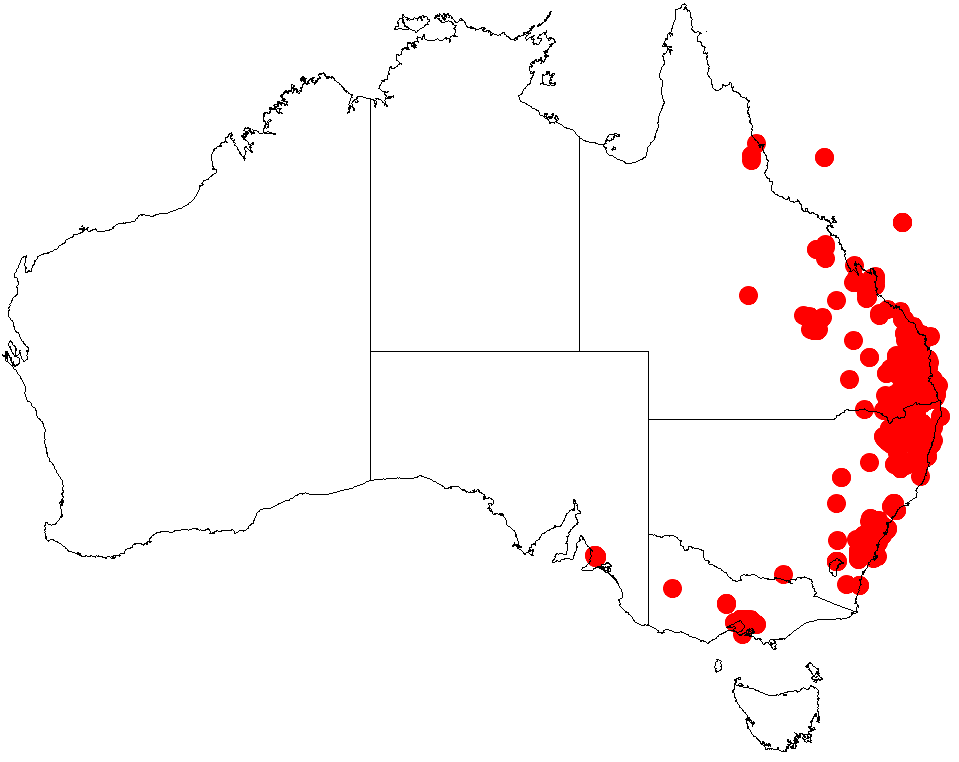
Distribution map of Acacia fimbriata

Acacia fimbriata, commonly known as fringed wattle, Brisbane golden wattle, or Brisbane wattle, is a species of flowering plant in the family Fabaceae and is endemic to the east coast of Australia. It is a shrub or tree with linear to narrowly oblong or narrowly lance-shaped phyllodes, spherical heads of bright golden yellow flowers and glabrous, firmly papery pods. It is the floral emblem of the city of Brisbane, Queensland.

== Description ==
Acacia fimbriata is a shrub or tree that typically grows to a height of up to 6–7 m (20–23 ft) and 6 m (20 ft) wide. It has slender branchlets covered with short hairs and linear to narrowly oblong or narrowly lance-shaped phyllodes usually 20–50 mm (0.79–1.97 in) long and 2–5 mm (0.079–0.197 in) wide with thin, sparsely to densely hairy edges. The flowers are arranged in spherical heads in racemes 15–75 mm (0.59–2.95 in) long on peduncles usually 1.5–5 mm (0.059–0.197 in) long. The heads are 10–20 mm (0.39–0.79 in) in diameter with eight to twenty bright yellow, sometimes paler yellow flowers. Flowering occurs between July and November, and the pods are straight to slightly curved, more or less flat and more or less straight-sided, firmly papery, 30–95 mm (1.2–3.7 in) long, 5–8.5 mm (0.20–0.33 in) wide and glabrous. The seeds are oblong to elliptic, 4–5 mm (0.16–0.20 in) long and slightly shiny with a club-shaped aril.

== Taxonomy ==
Acacia fimbriata was first formally described by the botanist George Don in 1832 in his book A General History of Dichlamydeous Plants from an unpublished manuscript by Allan Cunningham. The type specimen was collected by Cunningham in 1828 from along the Brisbane River.

== Distribution and habitat ==
Fringed wattle occurs in coastal areas and adjacent tablelands from near Yeppoon, Carnarvon National Park and Ravenshoe in Queensland and from Inverell to Nerriga in New South Wales. It often grows along rocky streams in Eucalyptus woodland, in rocky and sandy soils or along the fringes of rainforest in more northern areas.

== Use in horticulture ==
The plant can be propagated from seed and is hardy in most situations where adequate water is available. It is suitable as a hedge or screening plant and can be planted in a tropical environment and is frost tolerant.

== Floral symbol ==
In October 2023, the flower was chosen as the official floral symbol of Brisbane's floral emblems.

== Gallery ==
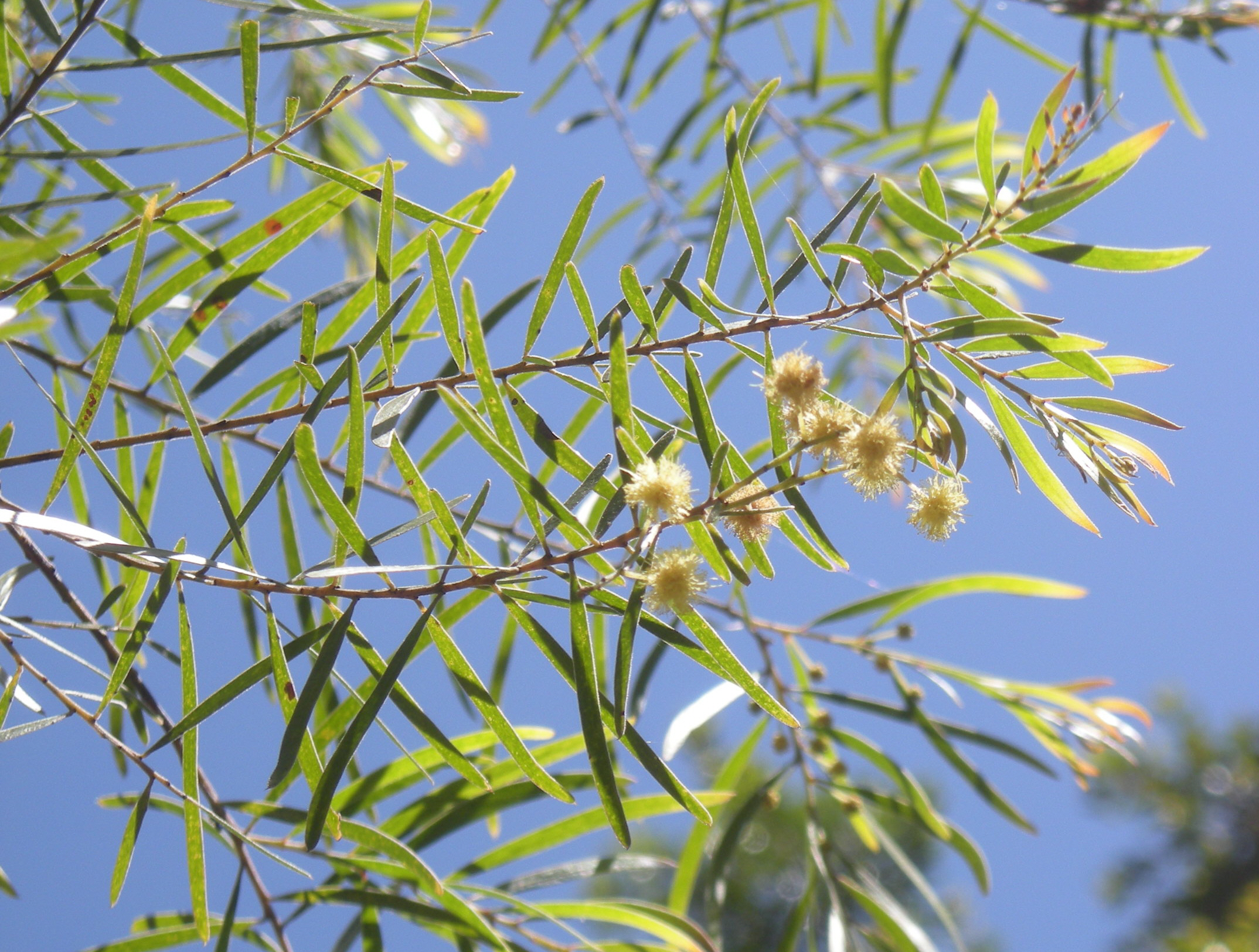
A. fimbriata foliage and flowers

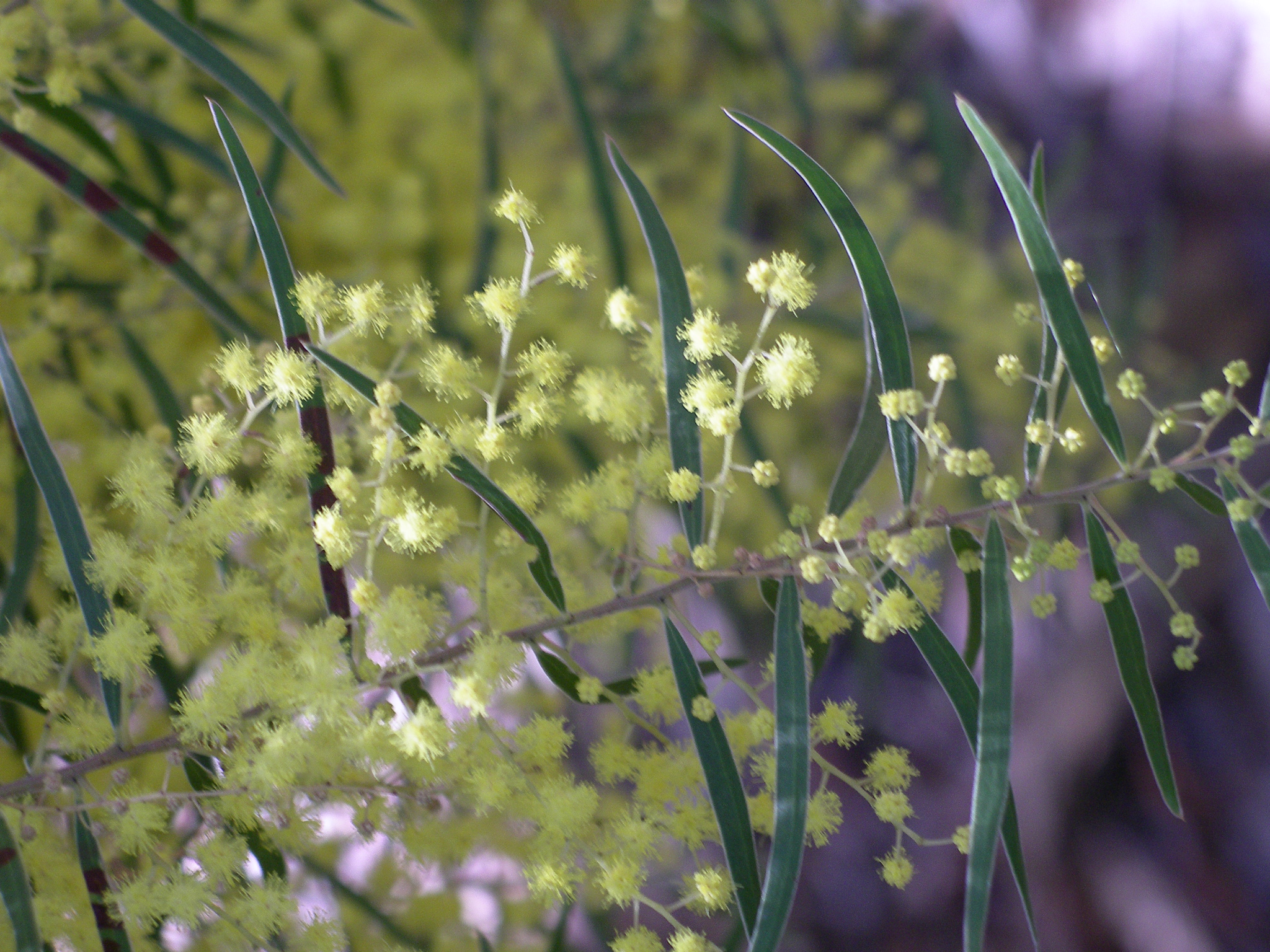
A. fimbriata foliage and flowers

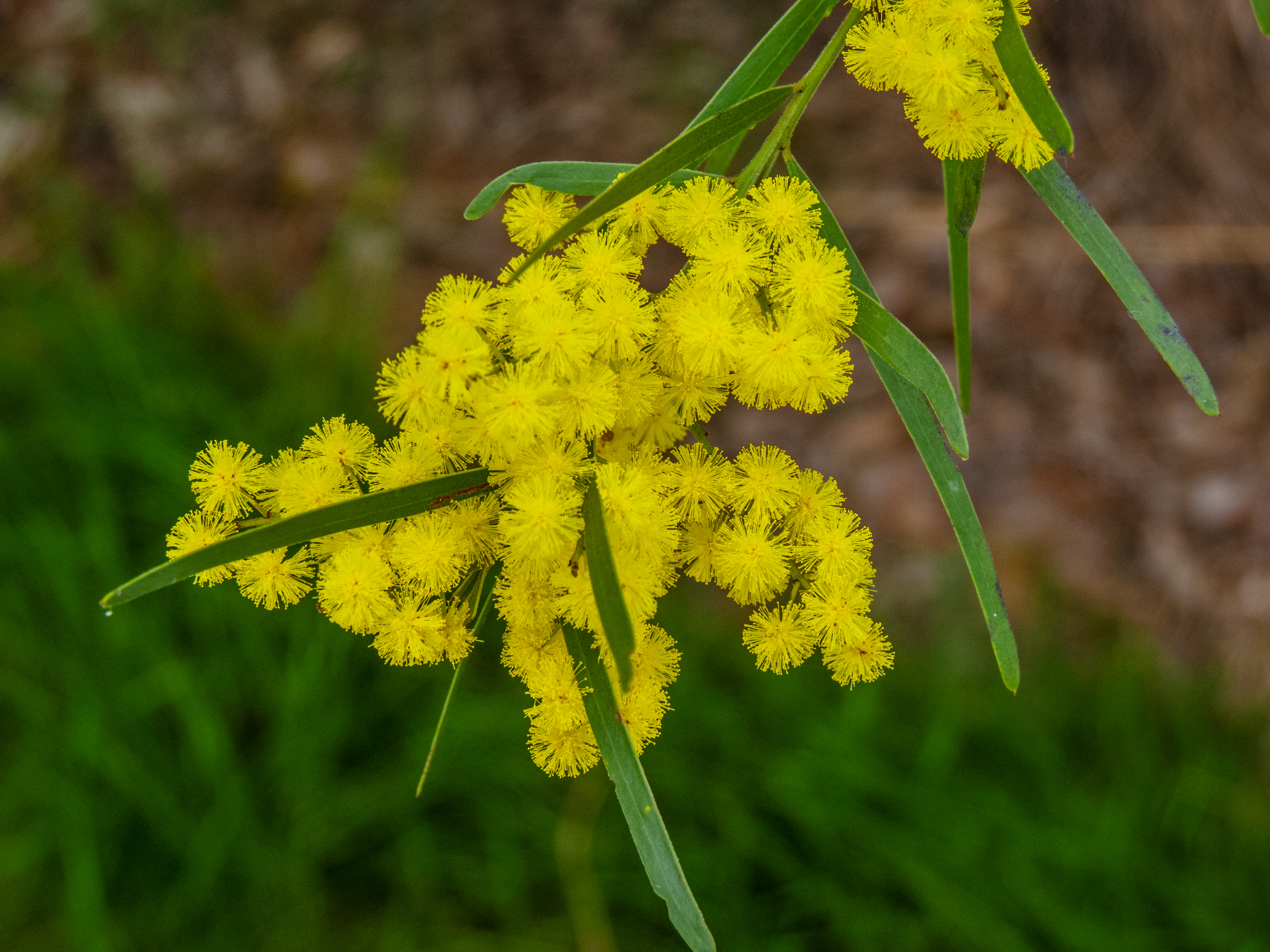
A. fimbriata inflorescence, 7th Brigade Park, Chermside, Queensland.

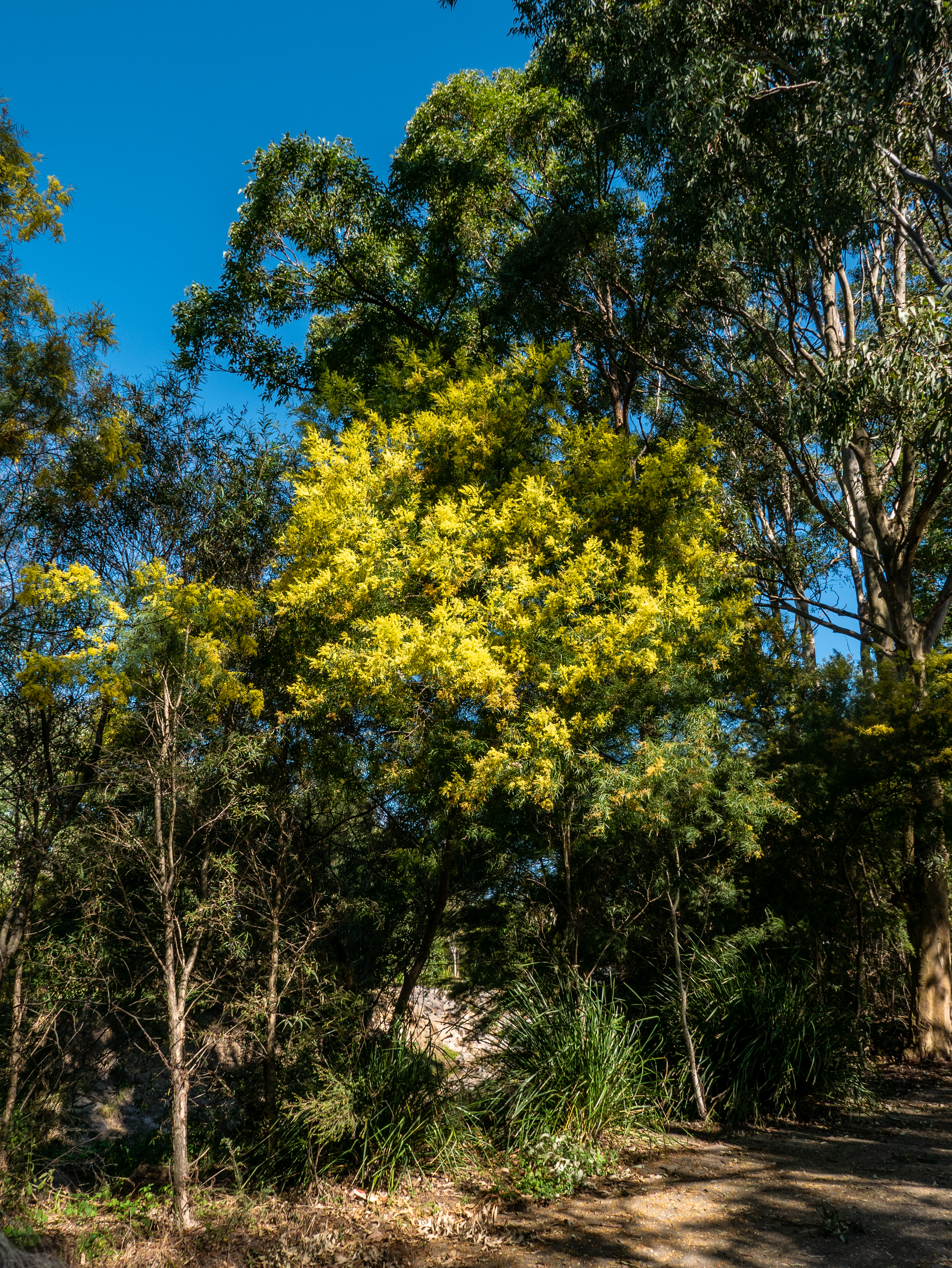
A. fimbriata

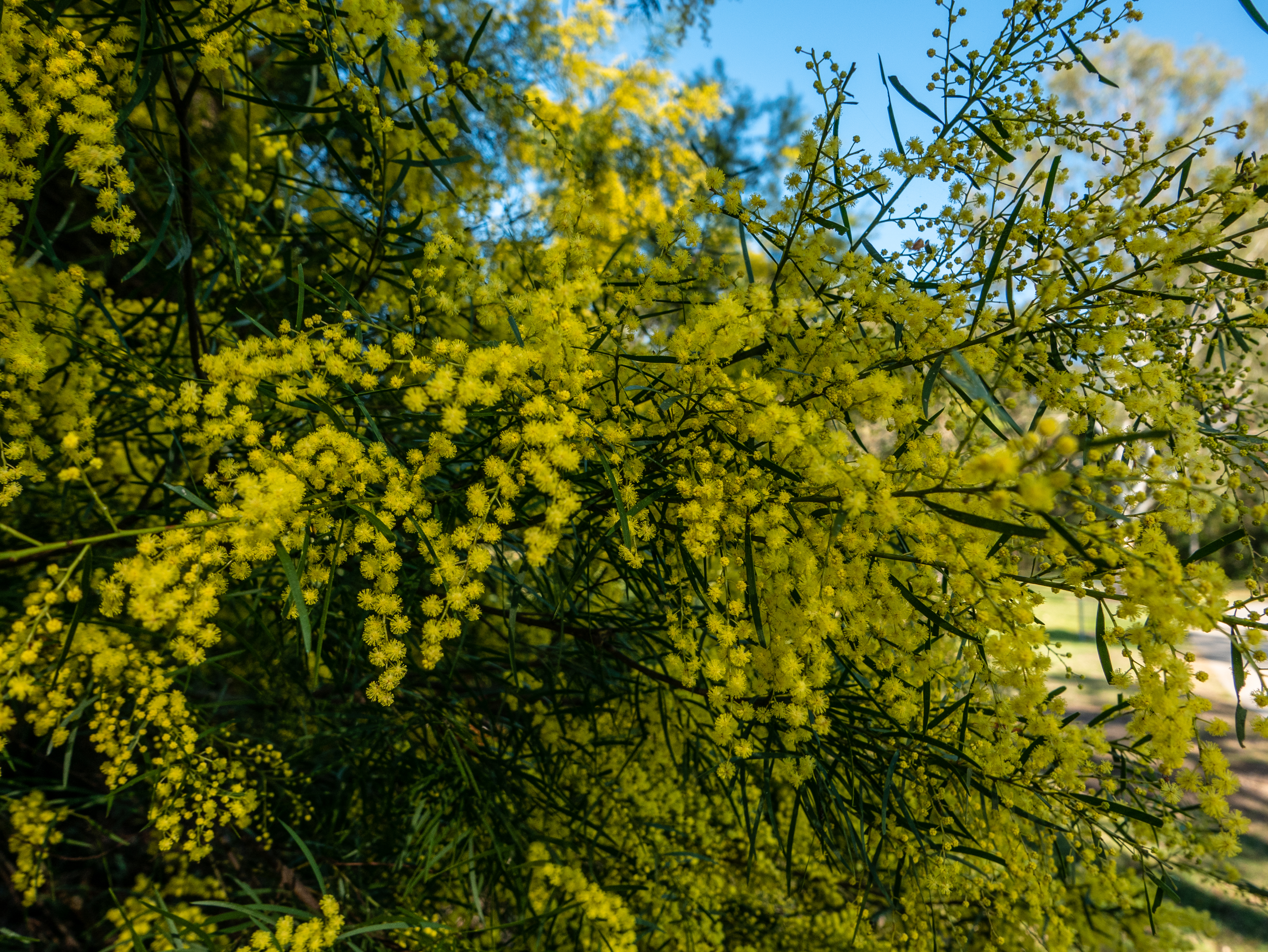
Inflorescences

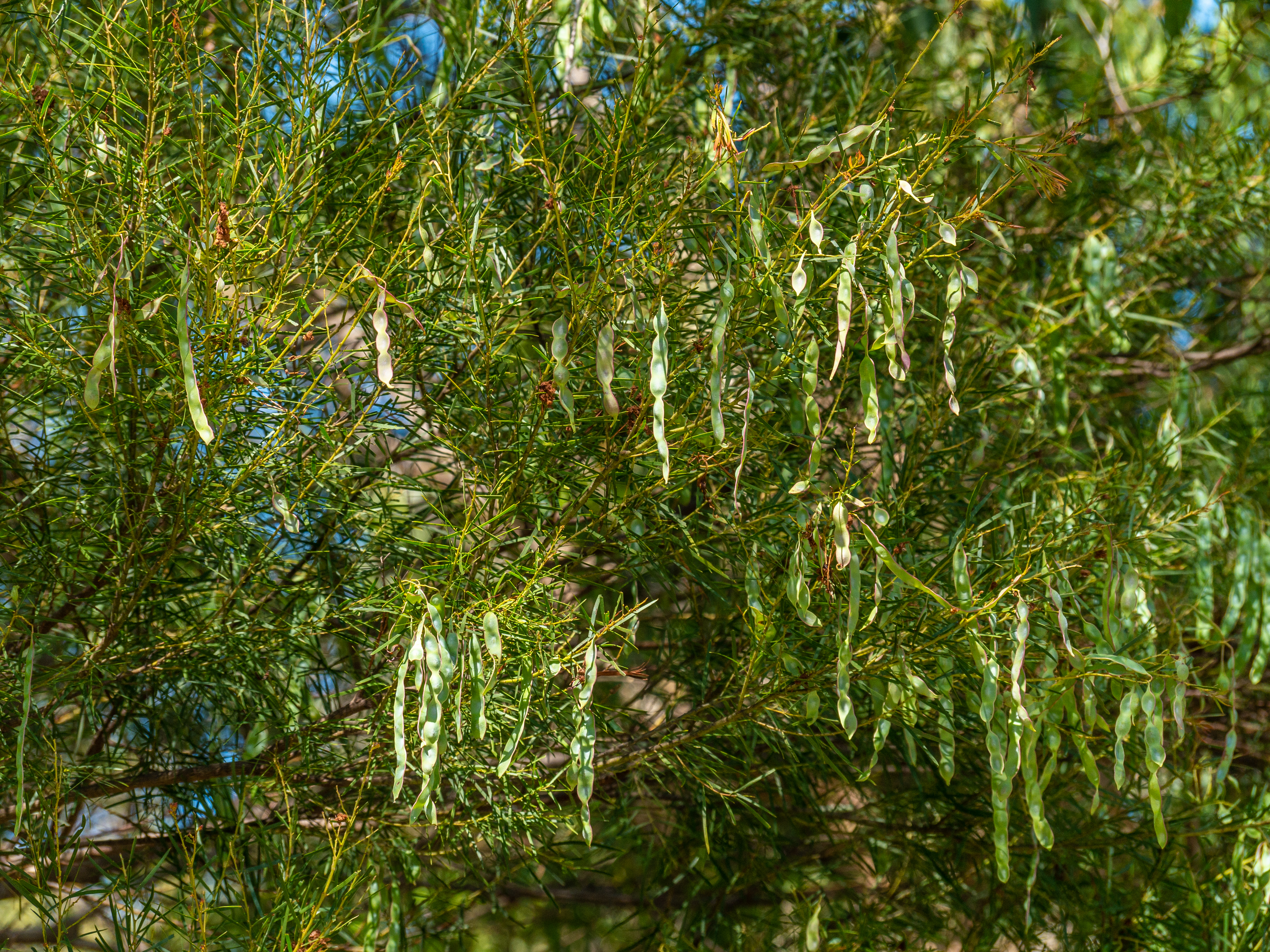
Immature pods

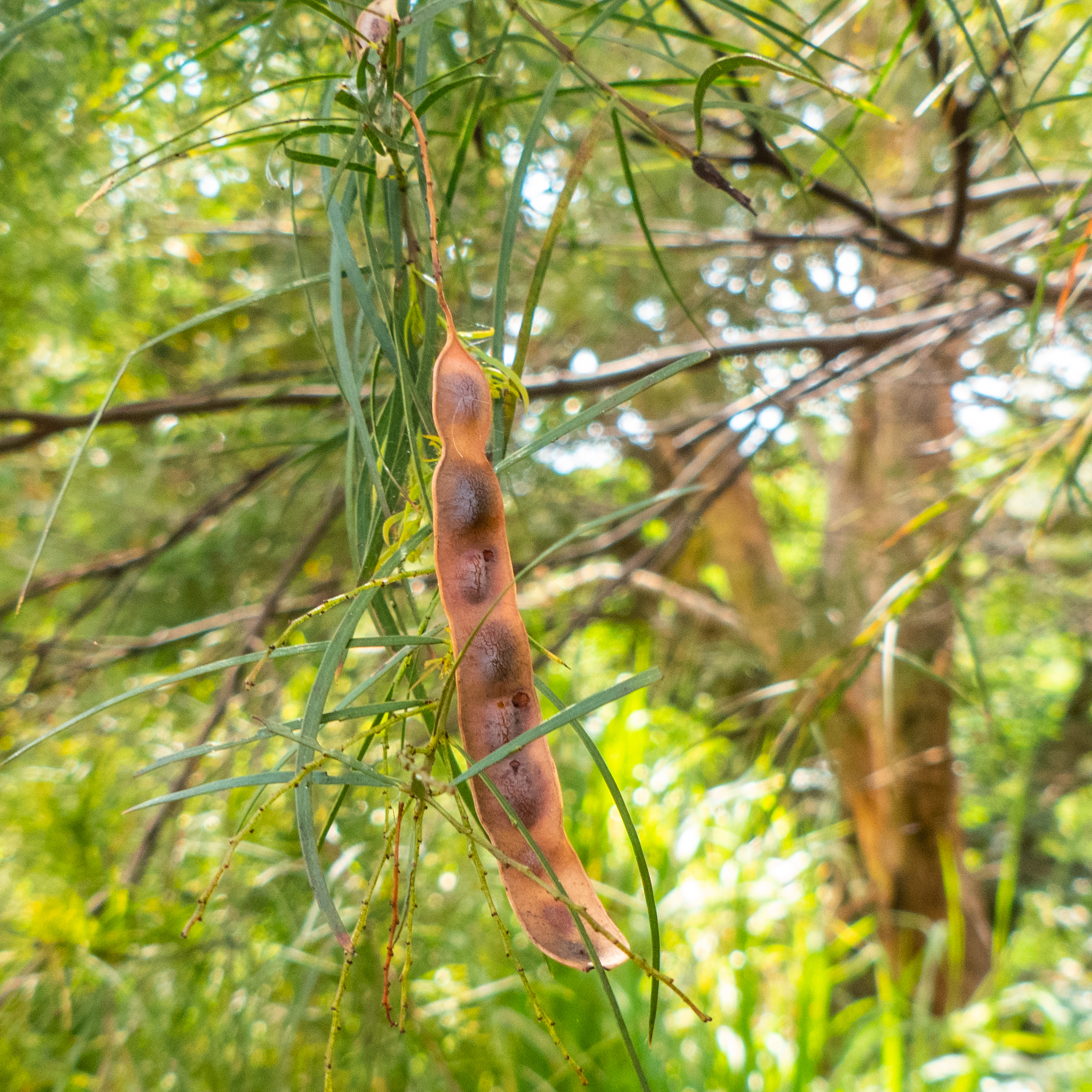
Mature pod.

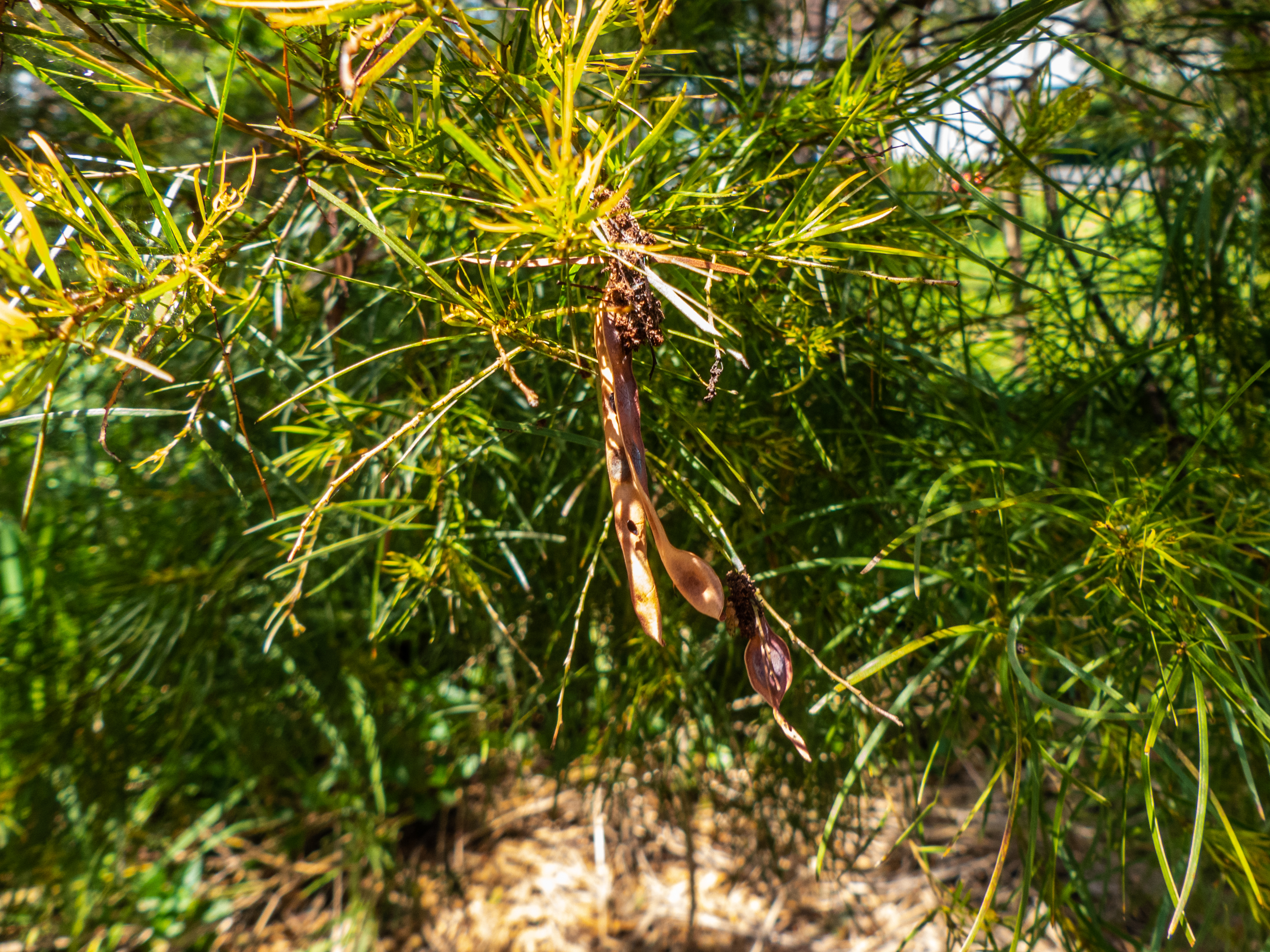
Mature pod and seeds.

== See also ==
List of Acacia species
