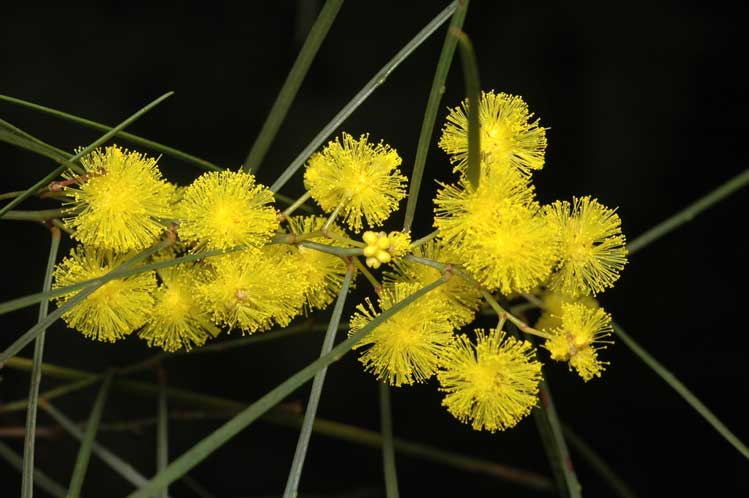
- In Mount Annan Botanic Garden

Conservation status
- Least Concern (IUCN 3.1)

Scientific classification
- Kingdom: Plantae
- Clade: Embryophytes
- Clade: Tracheophytes
- Clade: Spermatophytes
- Clade: Angiosperms
- Clade: Eudicots
- Clade: Rosids
- Order: Fabales
- Family: Fabaceae
- Subfamily: Caesalpinioideae
- Clade: Mimosoid clade
- Genus: Acacia
- Species: A. adunca

Binomial name
- Acacia adunca A.Cunn. ex G.Don

Synonyms
- List: Acacia accola Maiden & Betche; Acacia crassiuscula var. adunca (G.Don) Benth.; Racosperma aduncum (G.Don) Pedley

= Acacia adunca =

Wallangarra wattle

Species of legume

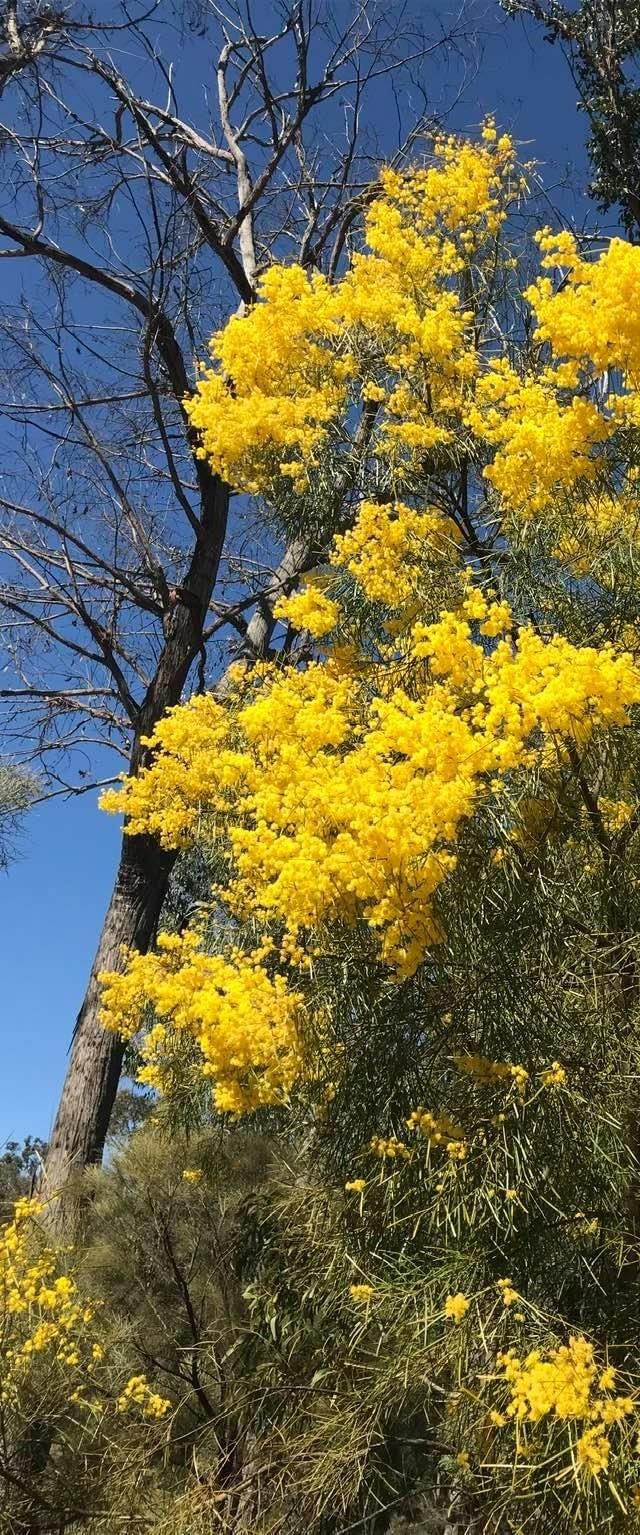
Habit

Acacia adunca, commonly known as Wallangarra wattle or cascade wattle, is a species of flowering plant in the family Fabaceae and is endemic to eastern Australia. It is an erect, bushy shrub or tree with narrowly linear phyllodes, racemes of spherical bright golden flowers, and leathery pods.

== Description ==
Acacia adunca is a bushy shrub or tree that typically grows up to a height of 6 m (20 ft), 3 m (9.8 ft) wide and has thin, dark reddish, glabrous branchlets. It has narrowly linear phyllodes 75–140 mm (3.0–5.5 in) long and 1.5–2.5 mm (0.059–0.098 in) wide and glabrous with one or two glands along the edges. The flowers are arranged in spherical heads along 4 to 11 axillary racemes that are 10–35 mm (0.39–1.38 in) long, the heads on a peduncle 3–5 mm (0.12–0.20 in) long and 5–7 mm (0.20–0.28 in) in diameter, with 9 to 14 bright yellow flowers. Flowering usually occurs from June to October and the pods are 50–130 mm (2.0–5.1 in) long and 10–12 mm (0.39–0.47 in) wide, raised on opposite sides over alternate seeds.

== Taxonomy ==
Acacia adunca was first formally described in 1832 by George Don in A General History of Dichlamydous Plants from an unpublished description by Allan Cunningham. The specific epithet (adunca) means "bent forward" or "hooked".

== Distribution and habitat ==
Wallangarra wattle grows in forest, woodland and shrubland at higher altitudes, from the Amiens State Forest near Stanthorpe in south-eastern Queensland to the Bolivia Range in north-eastern New South Wales.

== See also ==
- List of Acacia species
