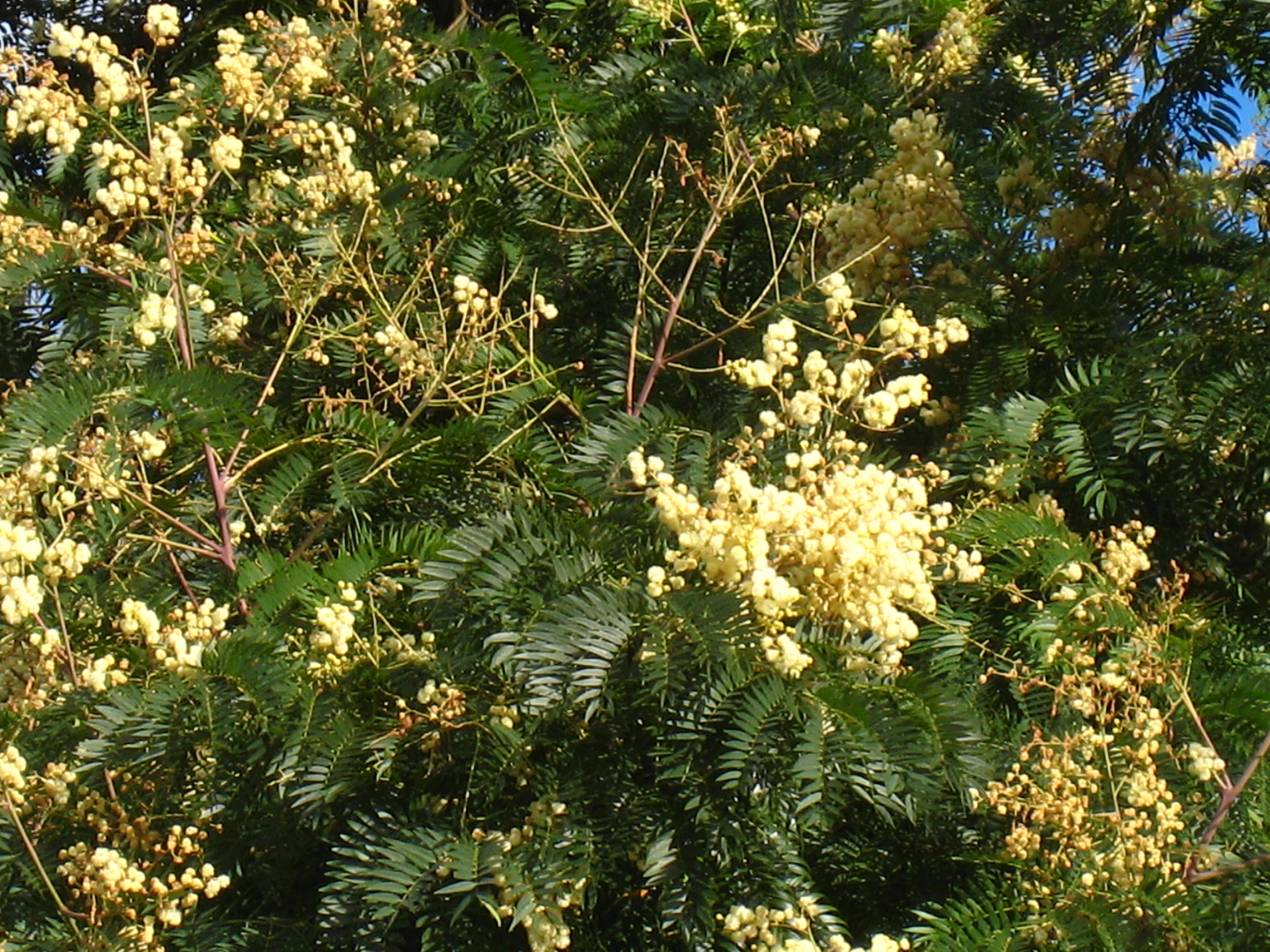

Scientific classification
- Kingdom: Plantae
- Clade: Tracheophytes
- Clade: Angiosperms
- Clade: Eudicots
- Clade: Rosids
- Order: Fabales
- Family: Fabaceae
- Subfamily: Caesalpinioideae
- Clade: Mimosoid clade
- Genus: Acacia
- Species: A. elata

Binomial name
- Acacia elata A.Cunn. ex Benth.
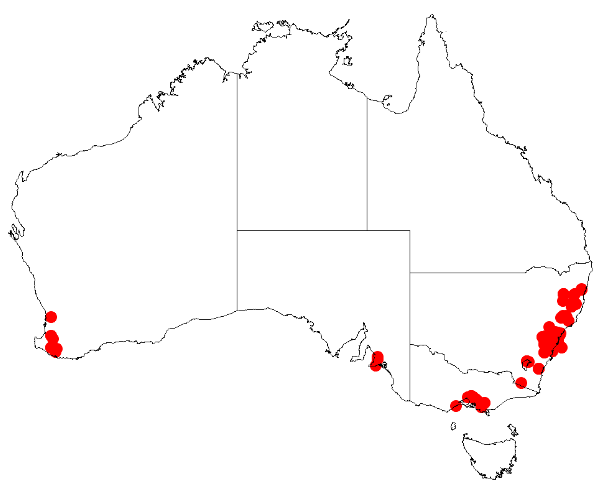
- Occurrence data from AVH

Synonyms
- Racosperma elatum (A.Cunn. ex Benth.) Pedley; Acacia terminalis auct. non (Salisb.) J.F.Macbr.: Court, A.B. in Willis, J.H. (1973)

= Acacia elata =

Cedar wattle

Species of legume

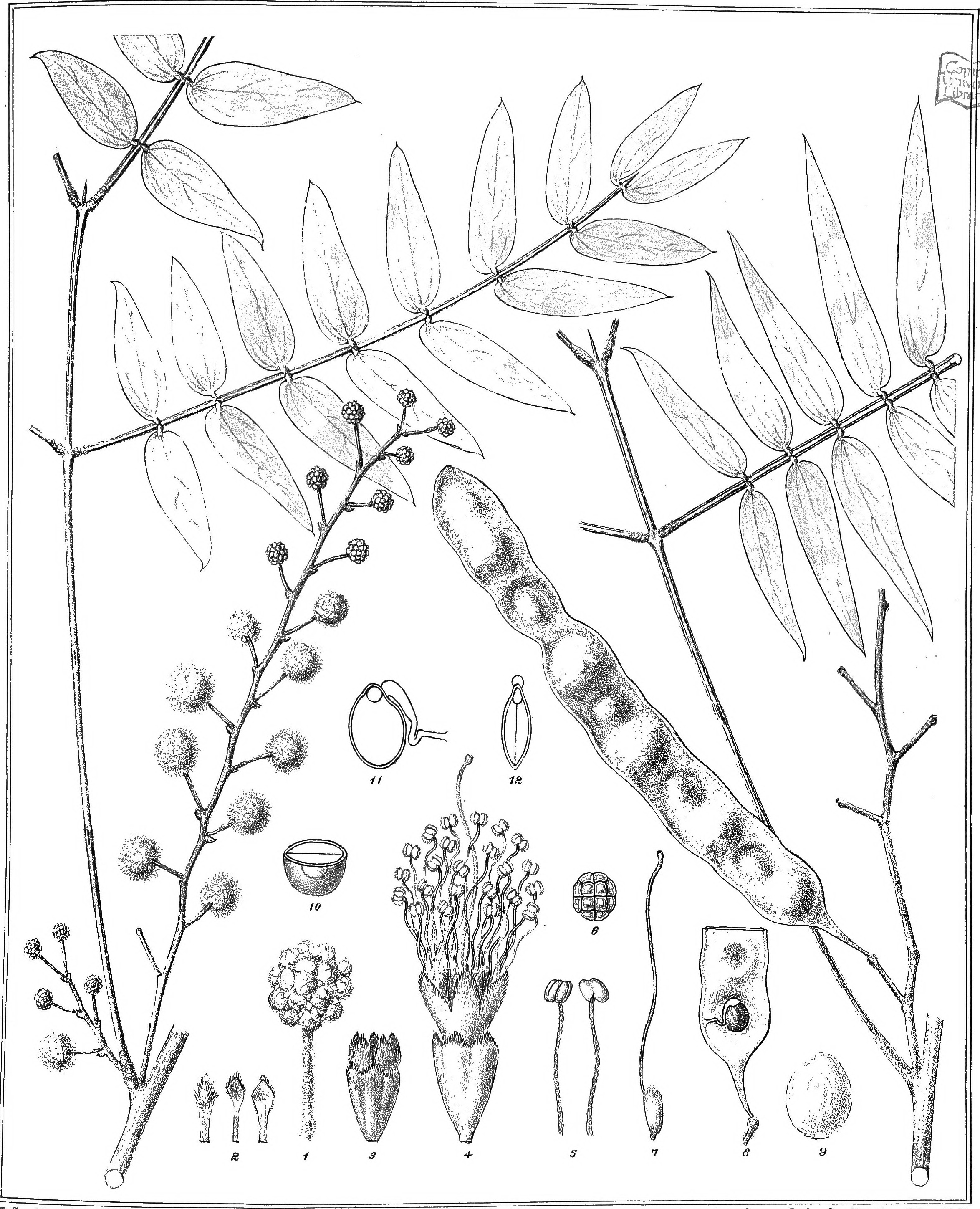
Illustration from Mueller's "Australian Species of Acacia"

Acacia elata, commonly known as cedar wattle or mountain cedar wattle, is a species of flowering plant in the family Fabaceae and is endemic to New South Wales. It is an erect tree with dark brown to black bark, bipinnate leaves, oblong to spherical heads of pale yellow or cream-coloured flowers and firmly, more or less straight and flat, papery to leathery pods.

== Description ==
Acacia elata is a tree that typically grows to a height of 7–20 m (23–66 ft) and a dbh of up to 0.6 m (2 ft 0 in). It dark brown to black, deeply fissured at the base, and branchlets with soft hairs when young.bark with a dark brown to black colour at the base of the tree, and terete branchlets that are hairy when young. The leaves are bipinnate with a rachis 80–170 mm (3.1–6.7 in) long in a petiole 25–75 mm (0.98–2.95 in) long. The upper surface of the leaves is dark green but much paler below. The leaves have 2 to 7 pairs of pinnae 100–230 mm (3.9–9.1 in) long with 8 to 22 pairs of lance-shaped to narrowly lance-shaped pinnules 20–60 mm (0.79–2.36 in) long. There is a prominent, dark brown gland below the lowest pinna and sometimes a gland at the base of the uppermost pinnae.

The flowers are borne in spherical heads in panicles or racemes on peduncles 2–11 mm (0.079–0.433 in) long, each head 7–10 mm (0.28–0.39 in) in diameter with 30 to 55 pale yellow to cream-coloured flowers. The pods are more or less straight, more or less flat, firmly papery to leathery, 40–175 mm (1.6–6.9 in) long, 9–15 mm (0.35–0.59 in) wide and densely covered with minute yellow hairs at first.

== Taxonomy ==
Acacia elata was first formally described in 1842 by the botanist George Bentham from an unpublished description by Allan Cunningham in William Jackson Hooker's London Journal of Botany. The specific epithet (elata) means 'tall or elated', "in reference to this being one of the tallest species of Acacia".

== Distribution and habitat ==
Cedar wattle is endemic to the coast and tablelands of New South Wales between the Orara River and the Budawang Range. It grows in tall open forest and rainforest, often along streams, in deep, sandy soils.

This species sometimes escapes from gardens and is considered as a weed in the wetter Warren and Jarrah Forest regions in the South West of Western Australia, where it grows in loamy lateritic soils. It has also become naturalised in other parts of Australia, including Queensland, the A.C.T. and parts of Victoria.

== Uses ==
Acacia elata is fast-growing, long-lived and suitable for cultivation in parks and large gardens. It has been used for fuelwood and it has potential of carpentry and wood turning.

== See also ==
- List of Acacia species
