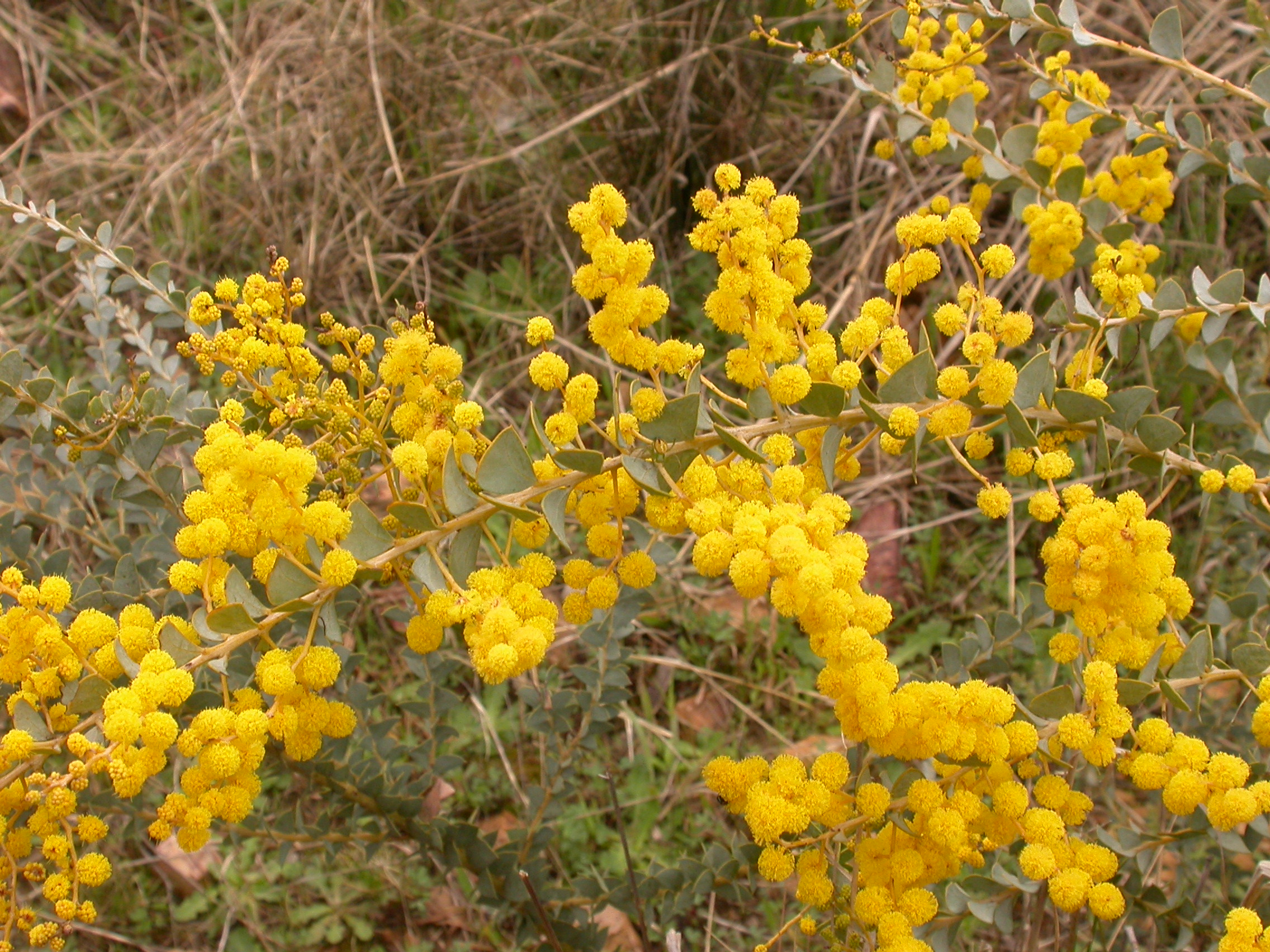

Scientific classification
- Kingdom: Plantae
- Clade: Tracheophytes
- Clade: Angiosperms
- Clade: Eudicots
- Clade: Rosids
- Order: Fabales
- Family: Fabaceae
- Subfamily: Caesalpinioideae
- Clade: Mimosoid clade
- Genus: Acacia
- Species: A. pravissima

Binomial name
- Acacia pravissima F.Muell.
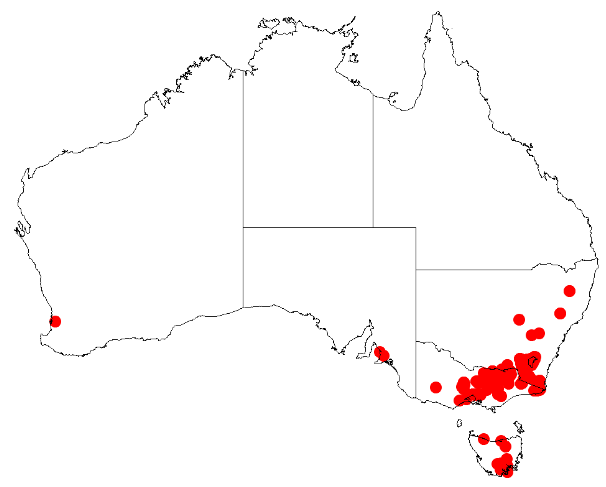
- Occurrence data from AVH

= Acacia pravissima =

Ovens wattle

Species of legume

Acacia pravissima, commonly known as Ovens wattle, Oven wattle, wedge-leaved wattle and Tumut wattle, is a species of flowering plant in the legume family, Fabaceae. It is an evergreen shrub native to southeastern Australia.

== Description ==
The tree or shrub typically grows to a height of 0.5 to 3 metres (1 1/2 to 10 ft) but can grow as tall as 8 m (26 ft) and has slender to spreading branches. The ribbed branchlets can be either glabrous or hairy. Like most species of Acacia it has phyllodes rather than true leaves. The grey-green coloured and crowded, on short stem-projections. The glabrous phyllodes are quite inequilateral with an obdeltate shape with a length of 7 to 16 millimetres (1/4 to 5/8 in) and a width of 5 to 14 mm (3/16 to 9/16 in).

It produces racemes of ball-shaped yellow flowers in winter and spring. The prolific inflorescences have spherical flower-heads with a diameter of 5 to 6 mm containing 8 to 12 golden coloured flowers. Following flowering, firmly chartaceous and glabrous seed pods form with a narrowly oblong shape, measuring up to 8 centimetres (3 in) long and 6–9 mm (1/4–3/8 in) wide. The dull black seeds inside have an oblong to ovate shape with a length of 3–5 mm (1/8–3/16 in) and a clavate aril.

== Taxonomy ==
The species was first formally described in 1853 by the botanist Ferdinand von Mueller. It was reclassified as Racosperma pravissimum by Leslie Pedley in 2006 then returned to genus Acacia in 2006. The Latin specific epithet pravissima means "very crooked".

== Distribution and habitat ==
In is endemic to southeastern Australia in the more elevated areas of the Great Dividing Range from around Tumut (e.g. the South West Slopes and Southern Tablelands) in New South Wales in the north through the Cotter Range and Australian Capital Territory down to around the Strathbogie Range and Macalister River in Victoria. It often grows in damp, sheltered sites and along creeks and streams, usually as a part of Eucalyptus forest and woodland communities.

== Cultivation ==
Ovens wattle is hardy and easy to grow. It can be propagated from scarified seed and grows in most soils, in full sun or part shade, preferring well-drained soil. It is frost hardy to −7 °C (19 °F).

== Gallery ==
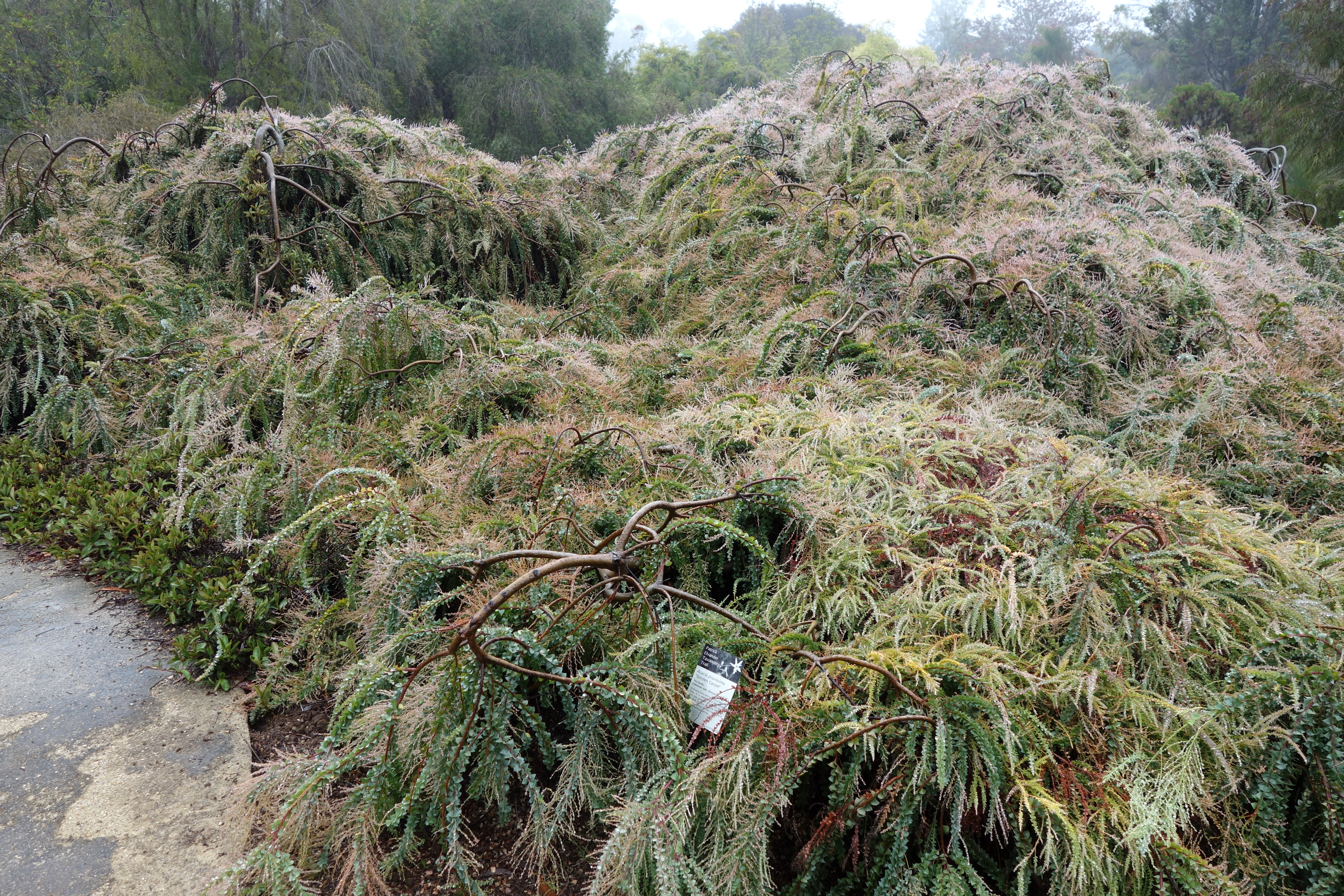

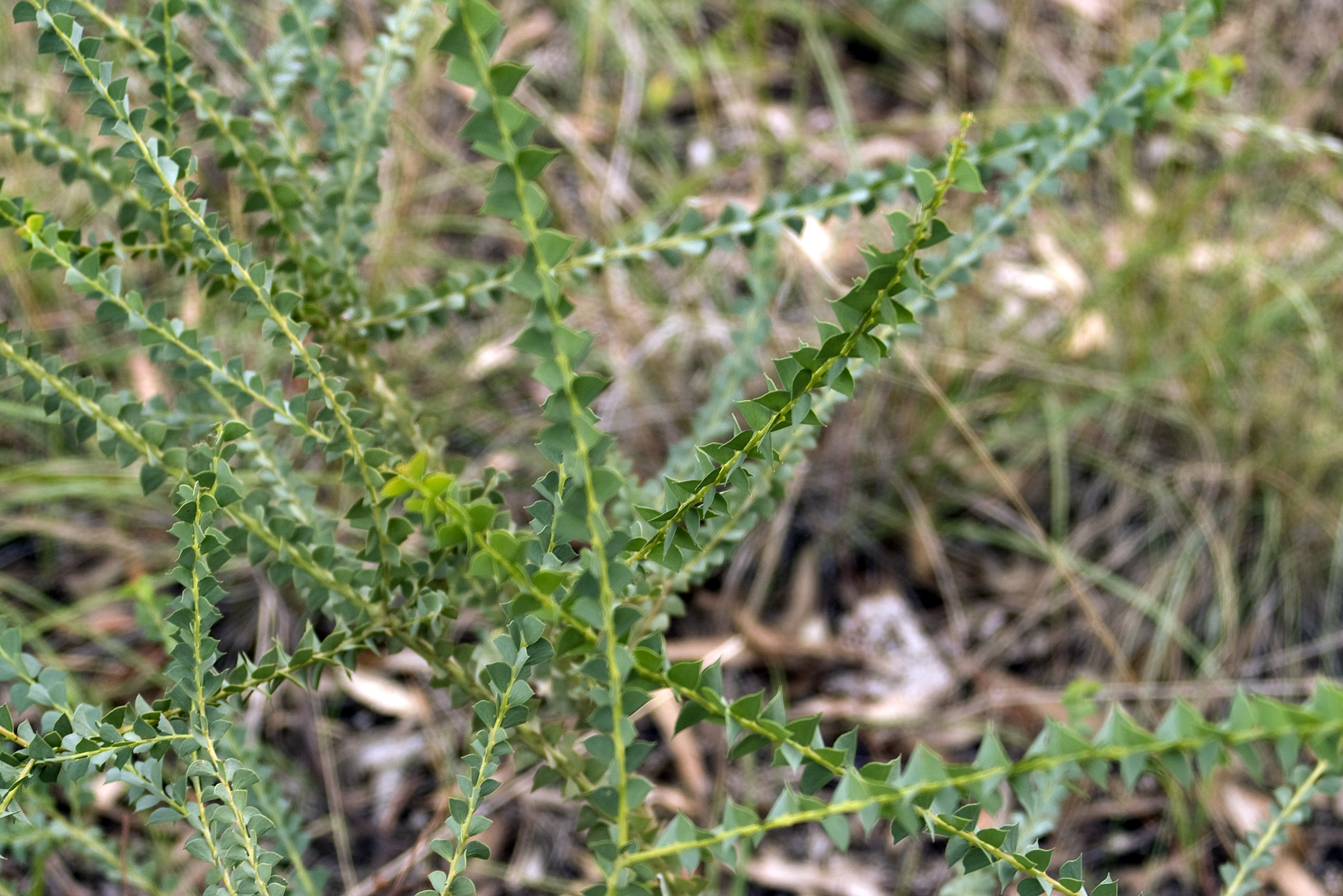

== See also ==
- List of Acacia species
