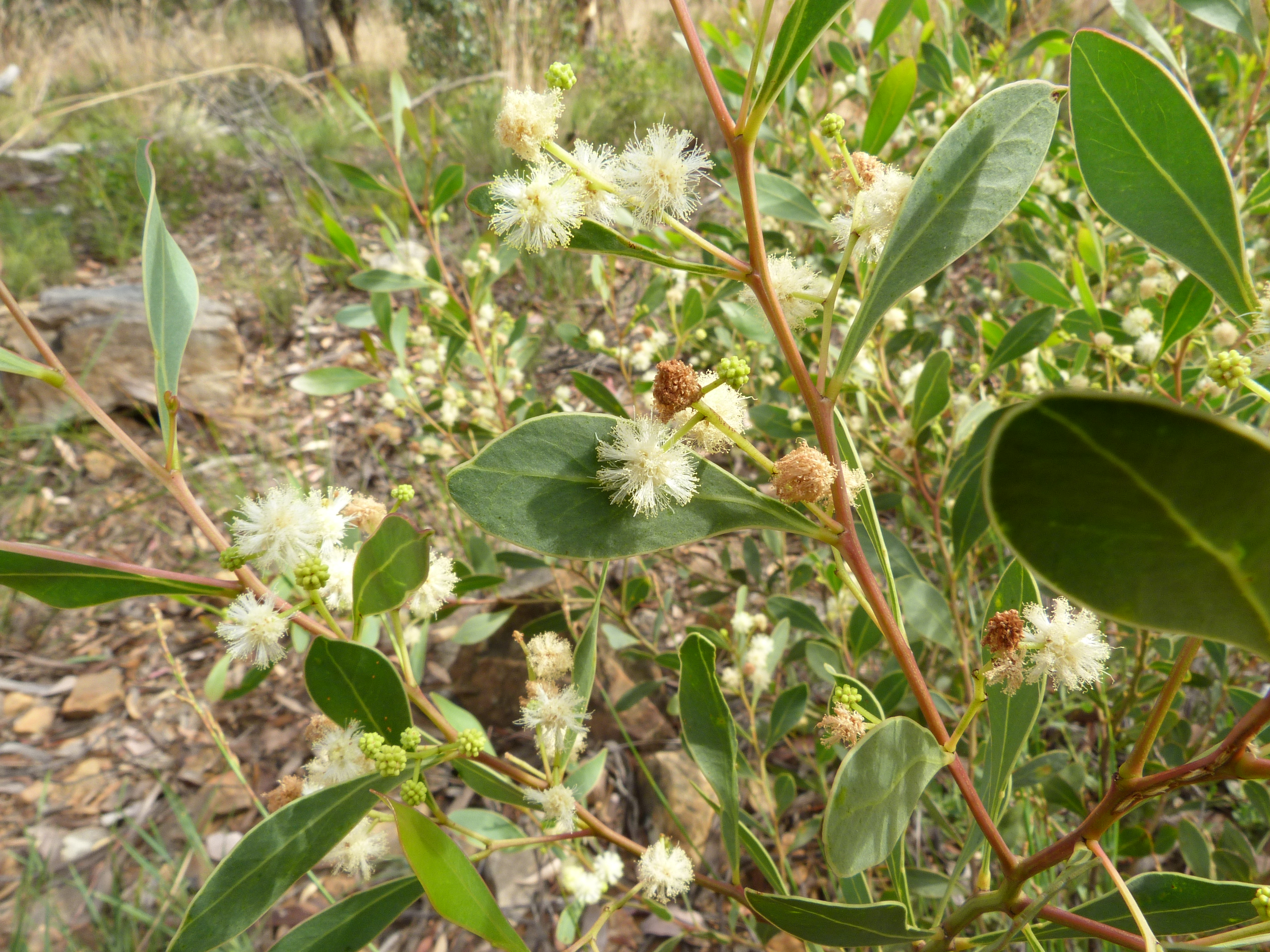

Scientific classification
- Kingdom: Plantae
- Clade: Tracheophytes
- Clade: Angiosperms
- Clade: Eudicots
- Clade: Rosids
- Order: Fabales
- Family: Fabaceae
- Subfamily: Caesalpinioideae
- Clade: Mimosoid clade
- Genus: Acacia
- Species: A. penninervis

Binomial name
- Acacia penninervis DC.
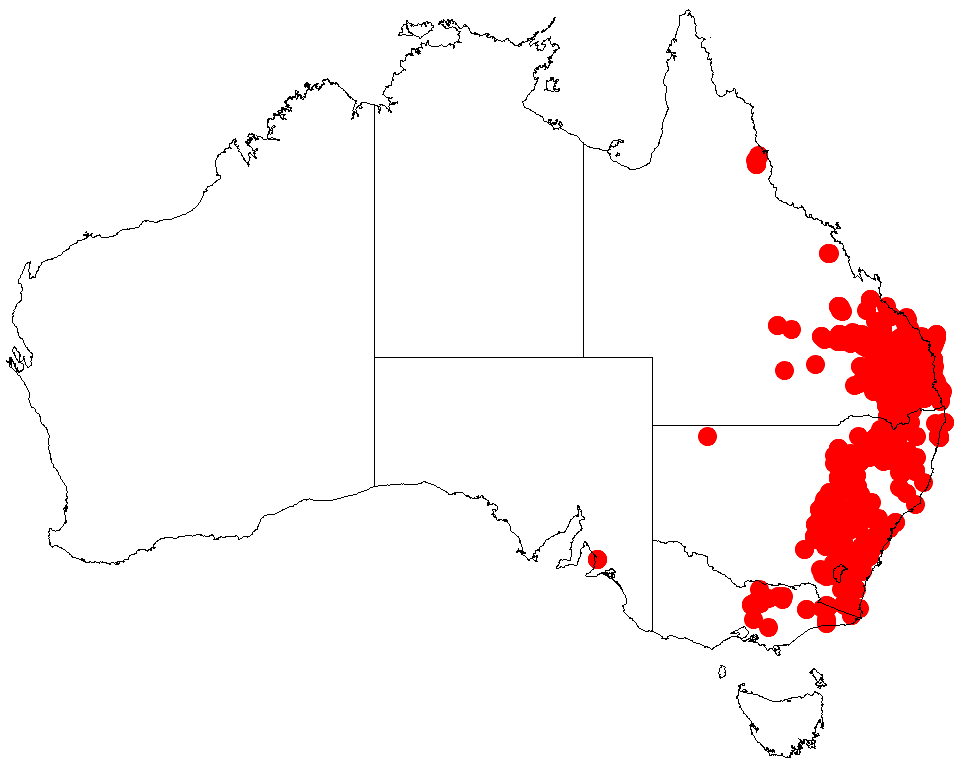
- Occurrence data from AVH

Synonyms
- Acacia impressa Lindl.; Acacia penninervis Sieber; Acacia penninervis DC. var. impressa (Lindl.)Domin; Racosperma penninerve (DC.)Pedley; Acacia impressa Lindl.

= Acacia penninervis =

Hickory wattle

Species of legume

Acacia penninervis, commonly known as mountain hickory wattle, or blackwood, is a perennial shrub or tree is an Acacia belonging to subgenus Phyllodineae, that is native to eastern Australia.

== Description ==
The shrub or tree typically grows to a height of 2 to 8 m (6 ft 7 in to 26 ft 3 in) and has an erect to spreading habit. It has finely or deeply fissured bark that is usually a dark grey colour. The glabrous branchlets are more or less terete and occasionally covered in a fine white powdery coating. Like most species of Acacia, it has phyllodes rather than true leaves. The glabrous and evergreen phyllodes have a narrowly oblanceolate or narrowly elliptic shape and are straight to slightly curved with a length of 5 to 15 cm (2.0 to 5.9 in) and a width of 7 to 40 mm (0.28 to 1.57 in) with a prominent midvein and marginal veins and are finely penniveined. The plant blooms throughout the year producing pale yellow flowers.

== Taxonomy ==
The species was first formally described by the botanist Augustin Pyramus de Candolle in 1825 as part of the work Leguminosae. Prodromus Systematis Naturalis Regni Vegetabilis. It was reclassified as Racosperma penninerve by Leslie Pedley in 1986 then transferred back to genus Acacia in 2006. Other synonyms include; Acacia impressa, Acacia penninervis var. impressa and Acacia impressa var. impressa.

=== Varieties ===
- Acacia penninervis var. longiracemosa
- Acacia penninervis var. penninervis

== Distribution ==
It occurs in the Australian states of the Australian Capital Territory, New South Wales, Queensland and Victoria, and as an introduced species on New Zealand's North Island and South Island. The variety A. p. var. penninervis occurs in the same Australian states. The variety A. p. var. longiracemosa occurs in coastal districts of southern Queensland and northern New South Wales.

== Uses ==
The 1889 book The Useful Native Plants of Australia records that common names included "Hickory" and "Blackwood" and that "The bark (and, according to some, the leaves) of this tree was formerly used by the aboriginals [sic.] of southern New South Wales for catching fish. They would throw them into a waterhole when the fish would rise to the top and be easily caught. Neither the leaves nor bark contain strictly poisonous substances, but, like the other species of Acacia, they would be deleterious, owing to their astringency."

Its uses include environmental management. The tannin content of the bark is approximately 18%.

== See also ==
- List of Acacia species

== Gallery ==
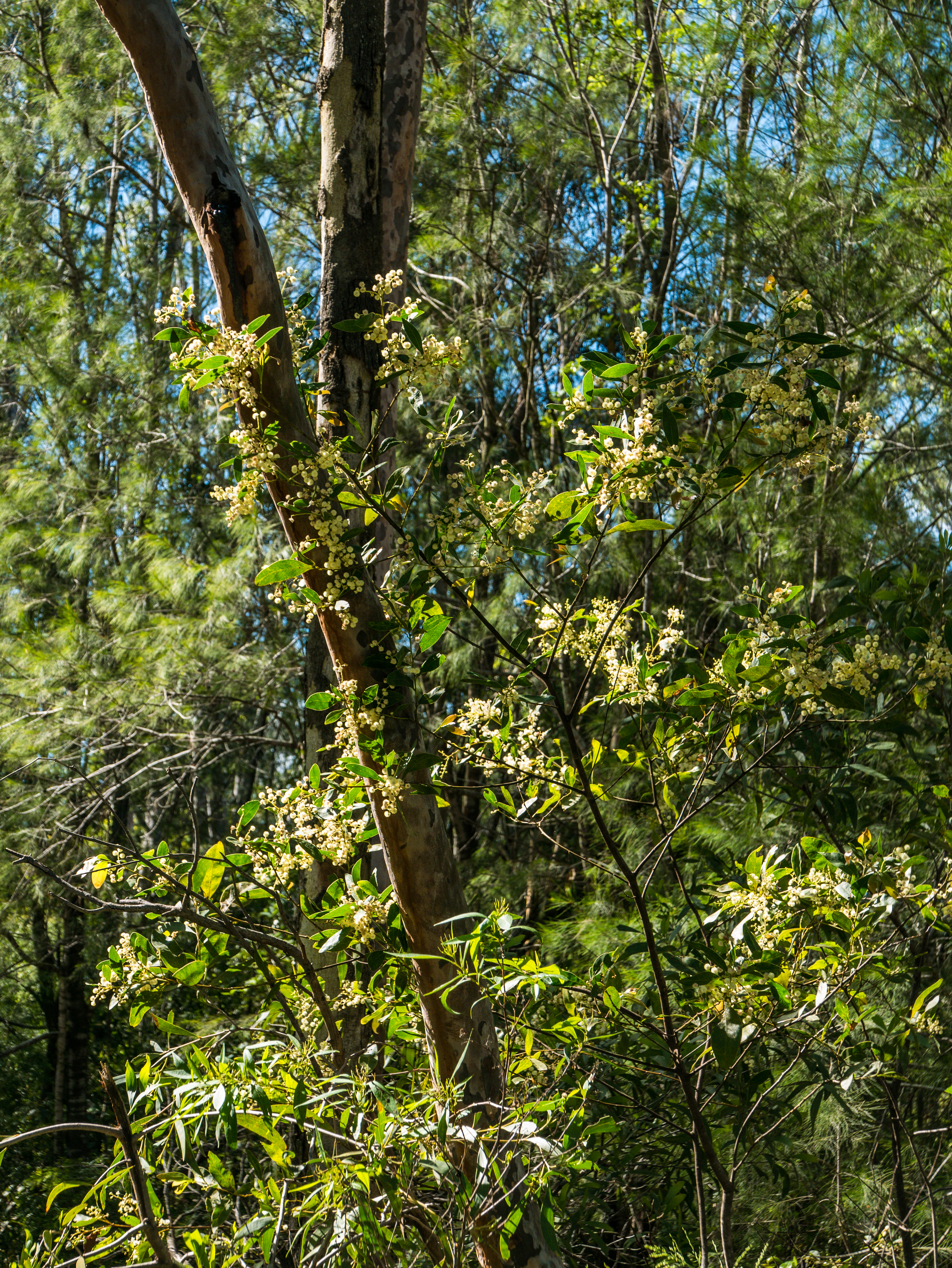
Acacia penninervis, 7th Brigade Park, Chermside, Queensland.

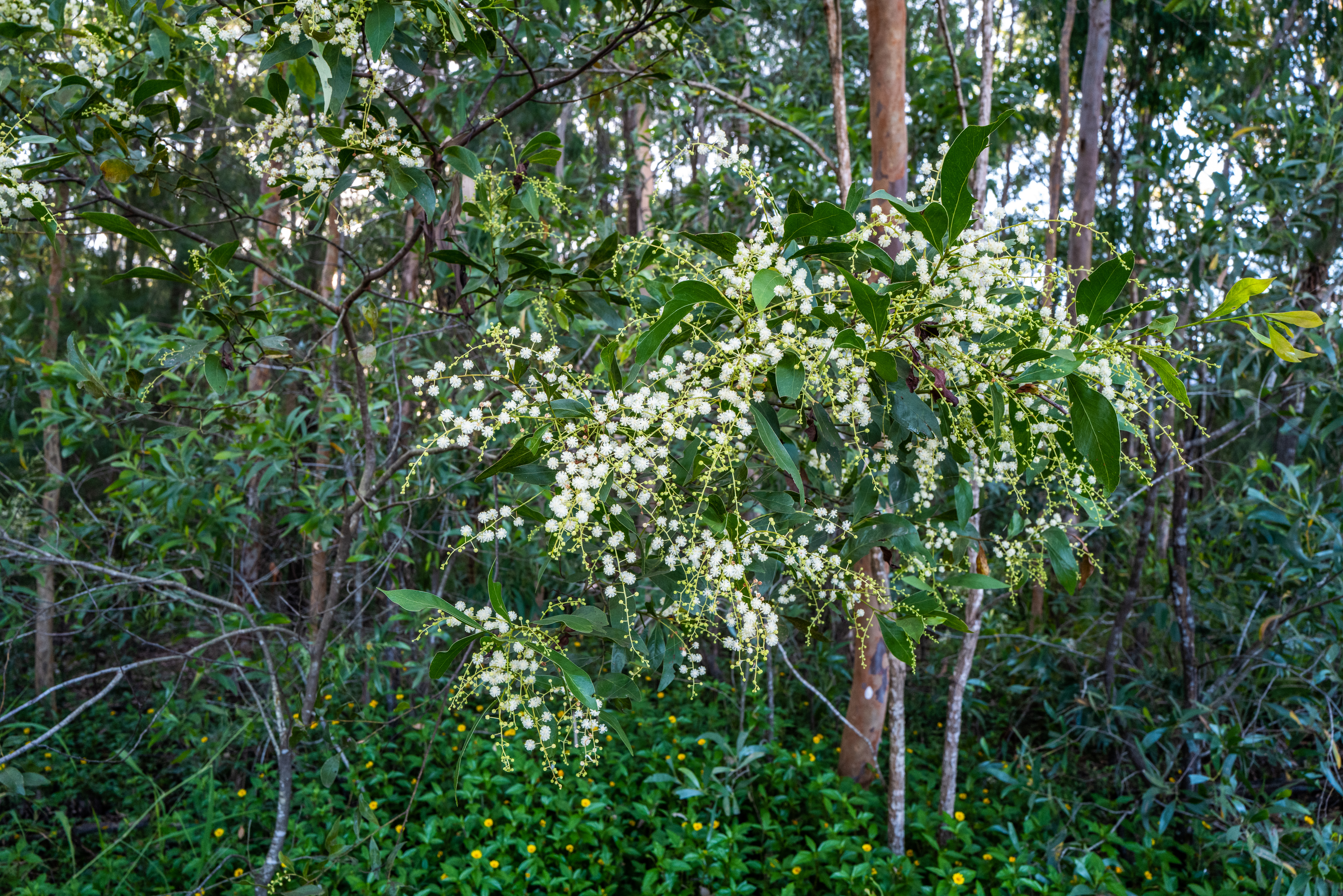
Inflorescences

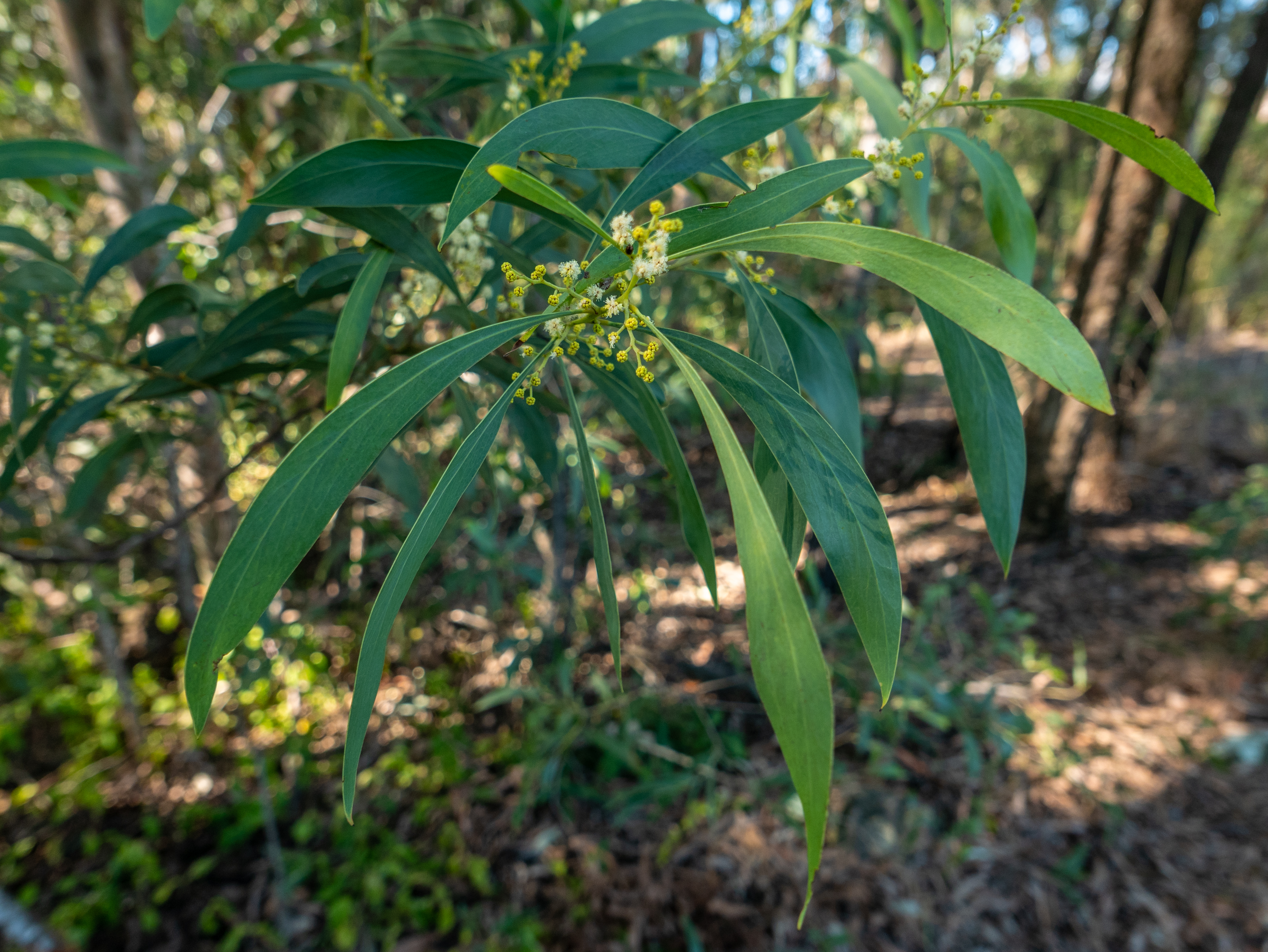
Inflorescences and foliage

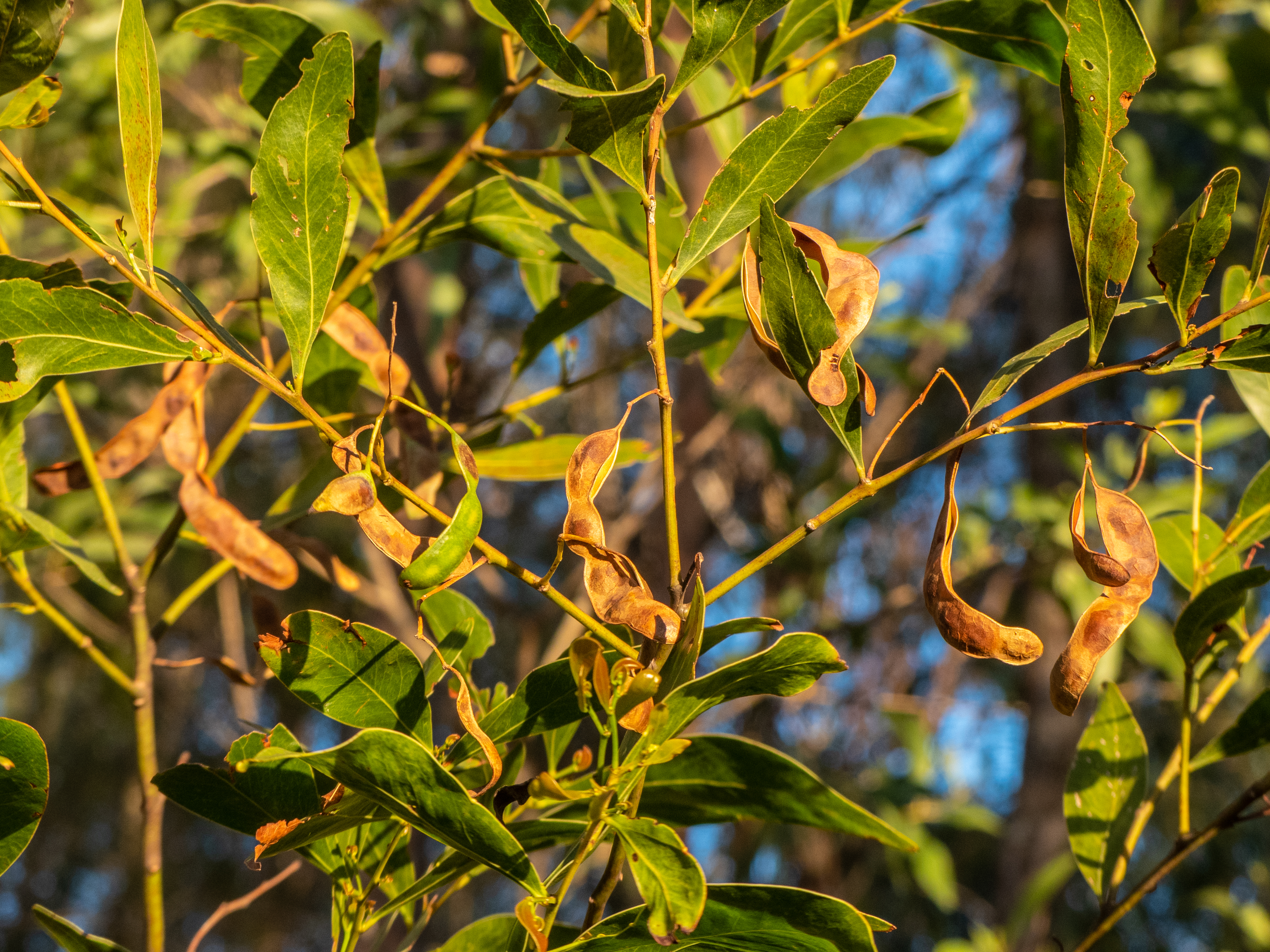
Seed pods

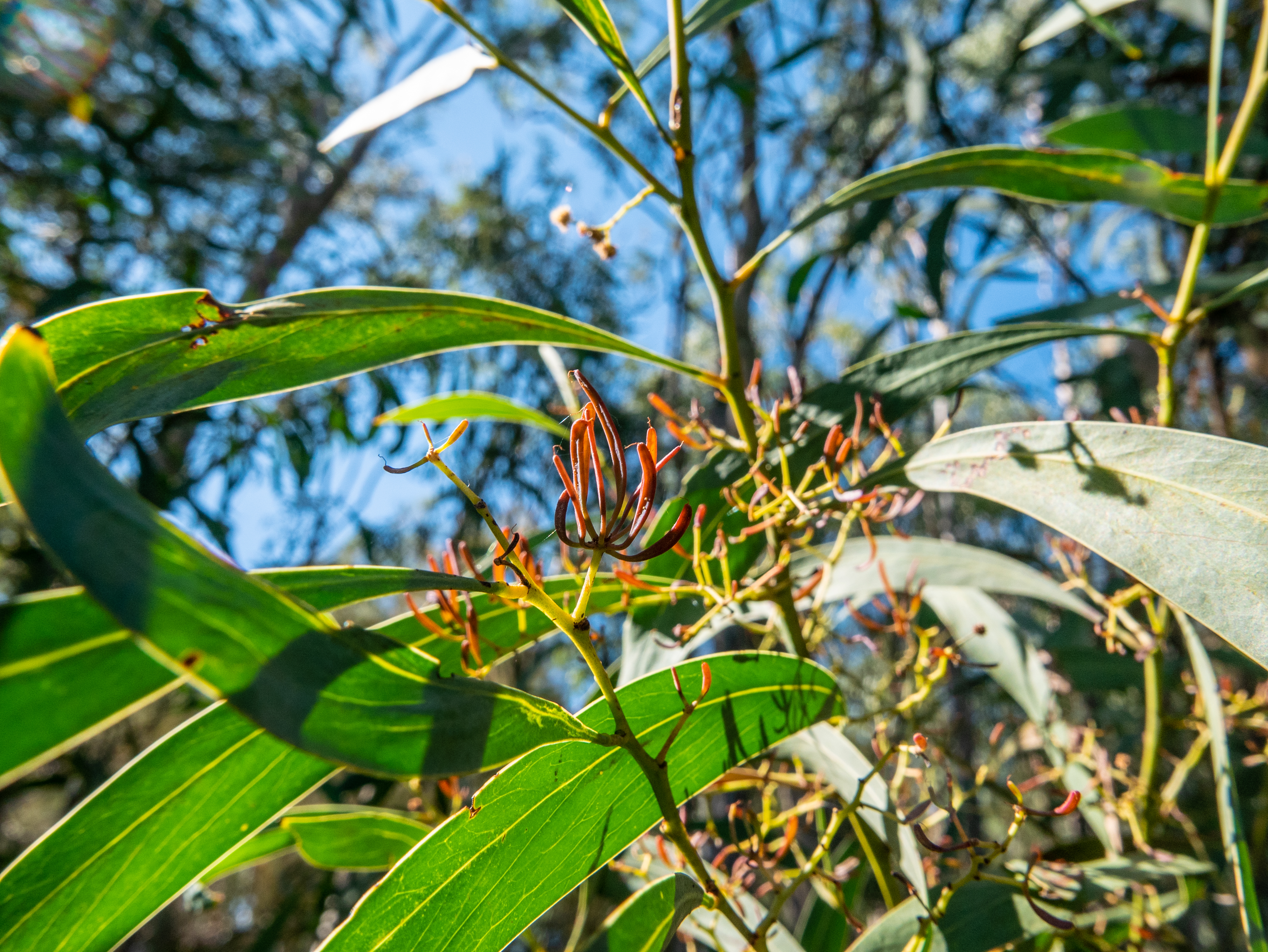
Seed pods and foliage

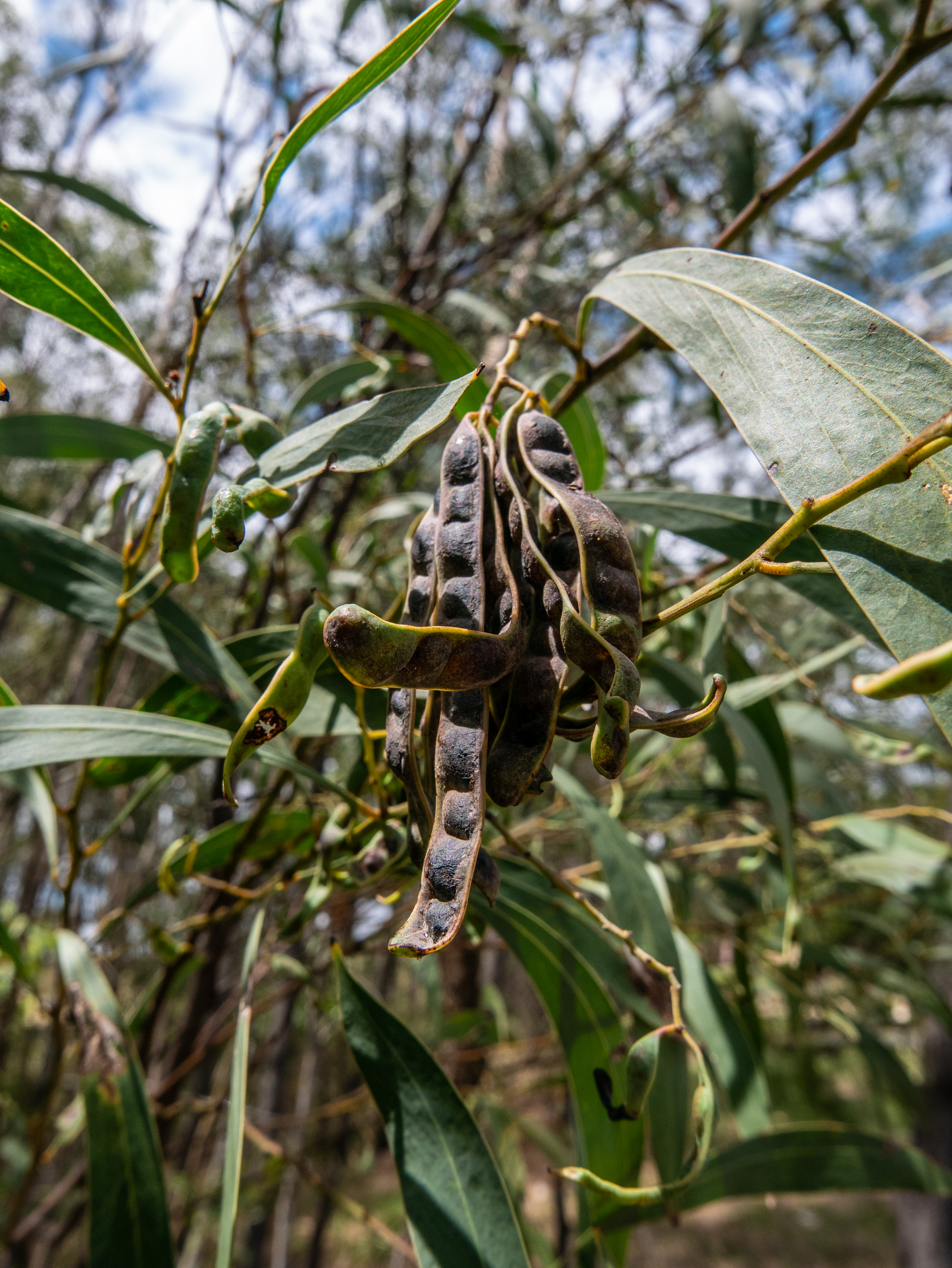
Seed pods
