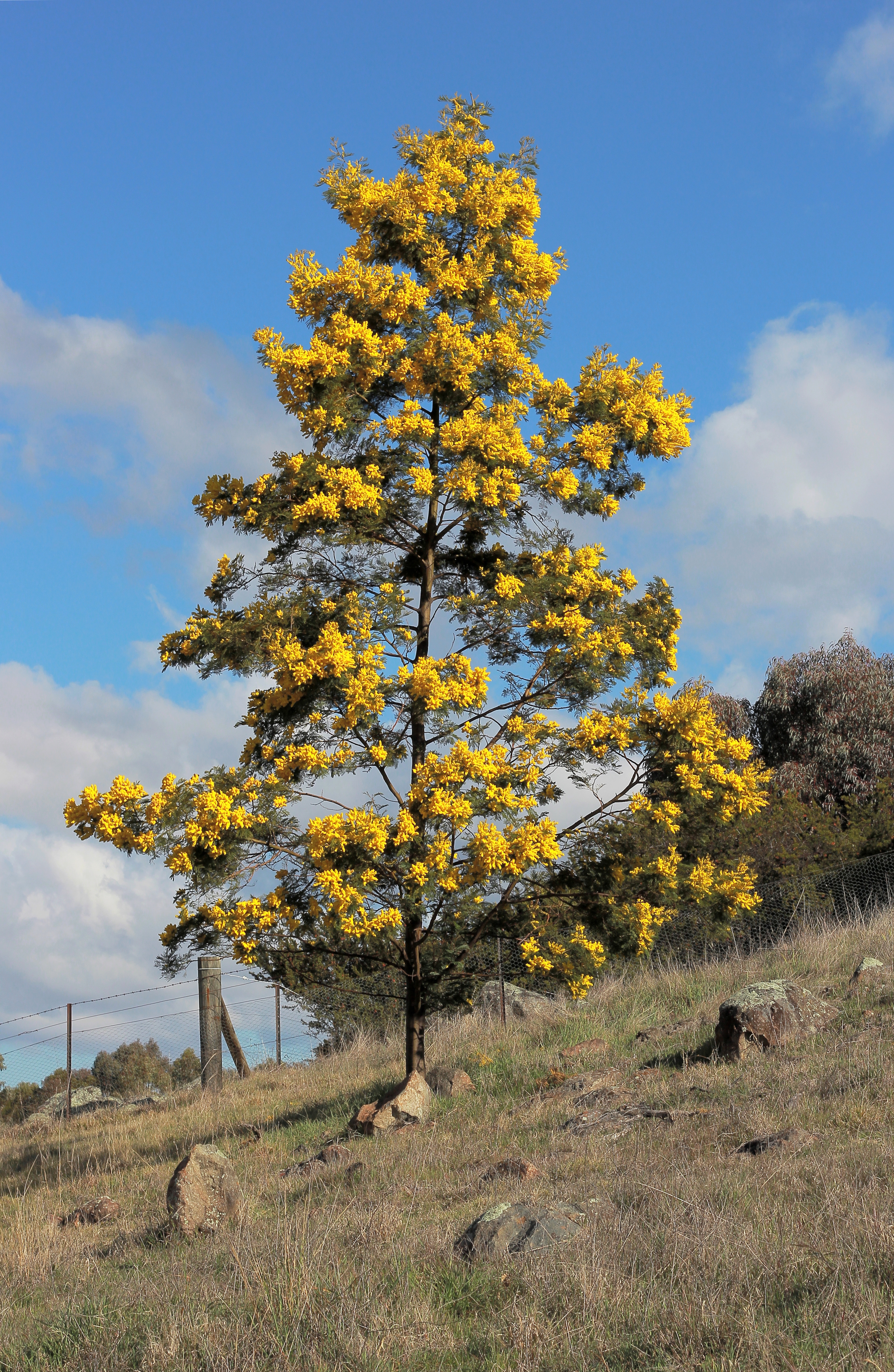
- Acacia baileyana in Canberra

Scientific classification
- Kingdom: Plantae
- Clade: Tracheophytes
- Clade: Angiosperms
- Clade: Eudicots
- Clade: Rosids
- Order: Fabales
- Family: Fabaceae
- Subfamily: Caesalpinioideae
- Clade: Mimosoid clade
- Genus: Acacia; Mill.

Type species
- Acacia penninervis Sieber ex DC. (typ.cons.)

Species
- List of Acacia species

Synonyms
- List: Adianthum Burm.f.; Chithonanthus Lehm.; Cuparilla Raf.; Drepaphyla Raf.; Hecatandra Raf.; Phyllodoce Link; Racosperma Mart.; Tetracheilos Lehm.; Zigmaloba Raf.

= Acacia =

Acacia Temporal range: Eocene–Present

Genus of plants

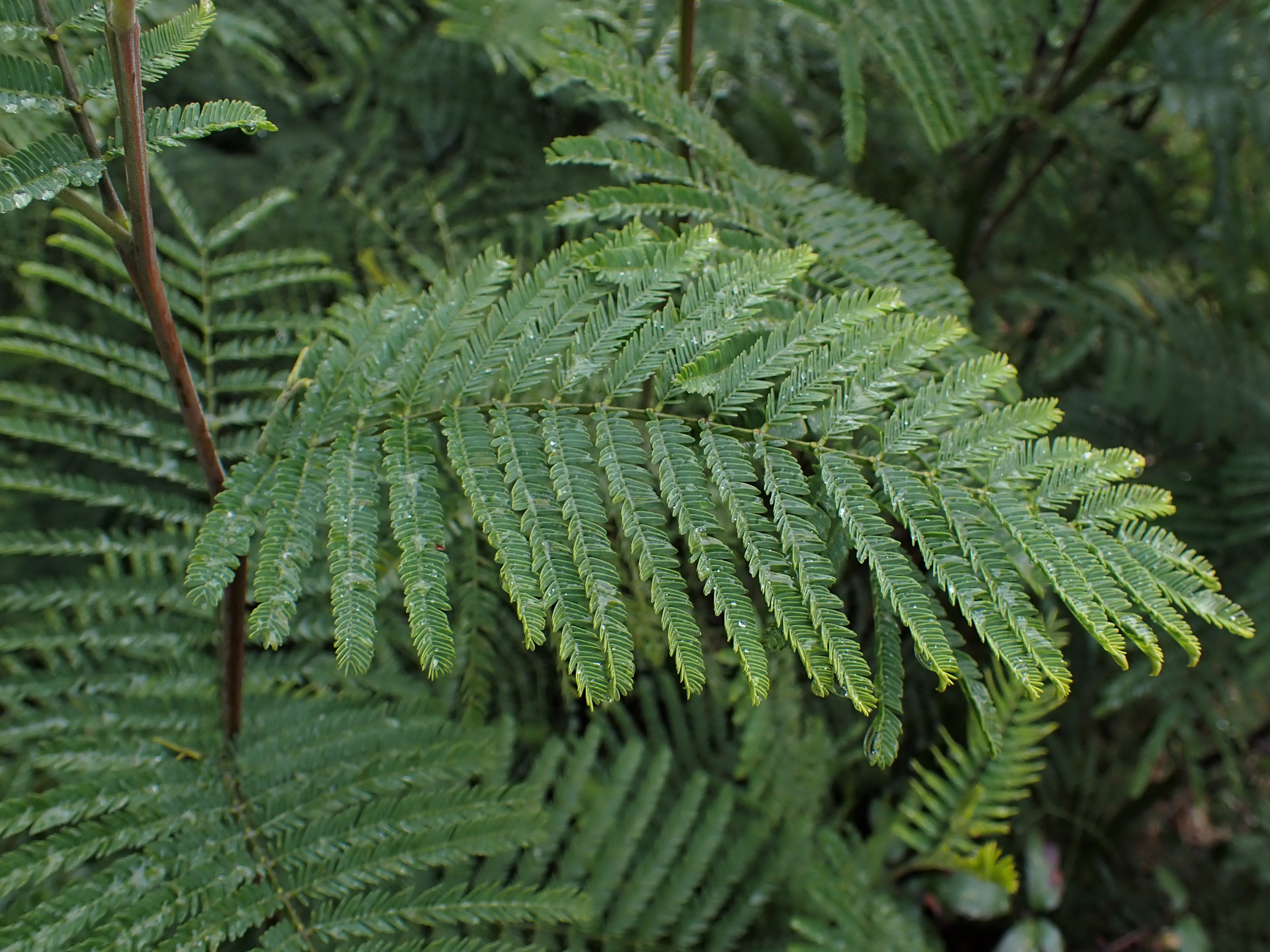
Bipinnate leaves of Acacia dealbata

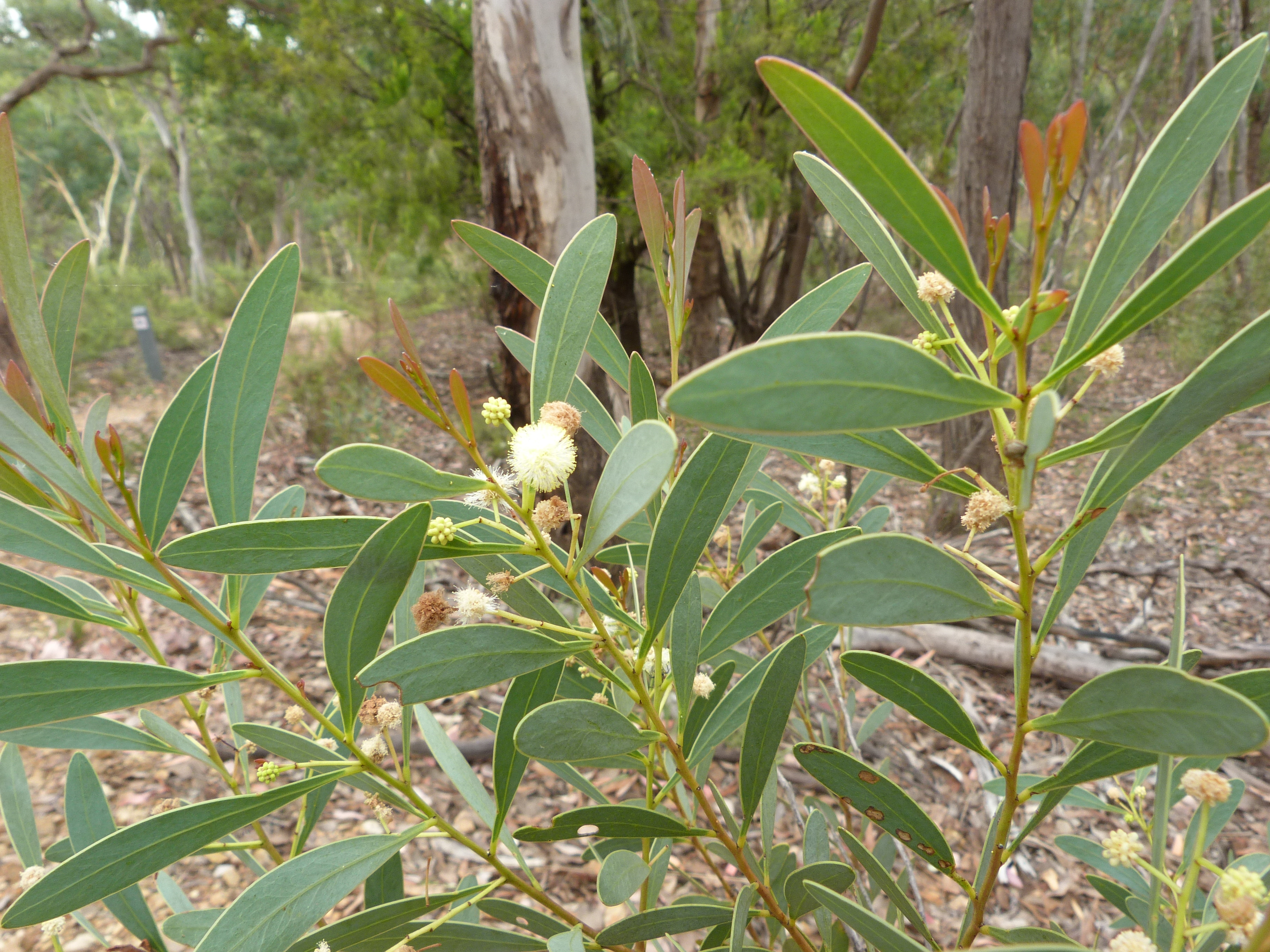
Phyllodes of Acacia penninervis

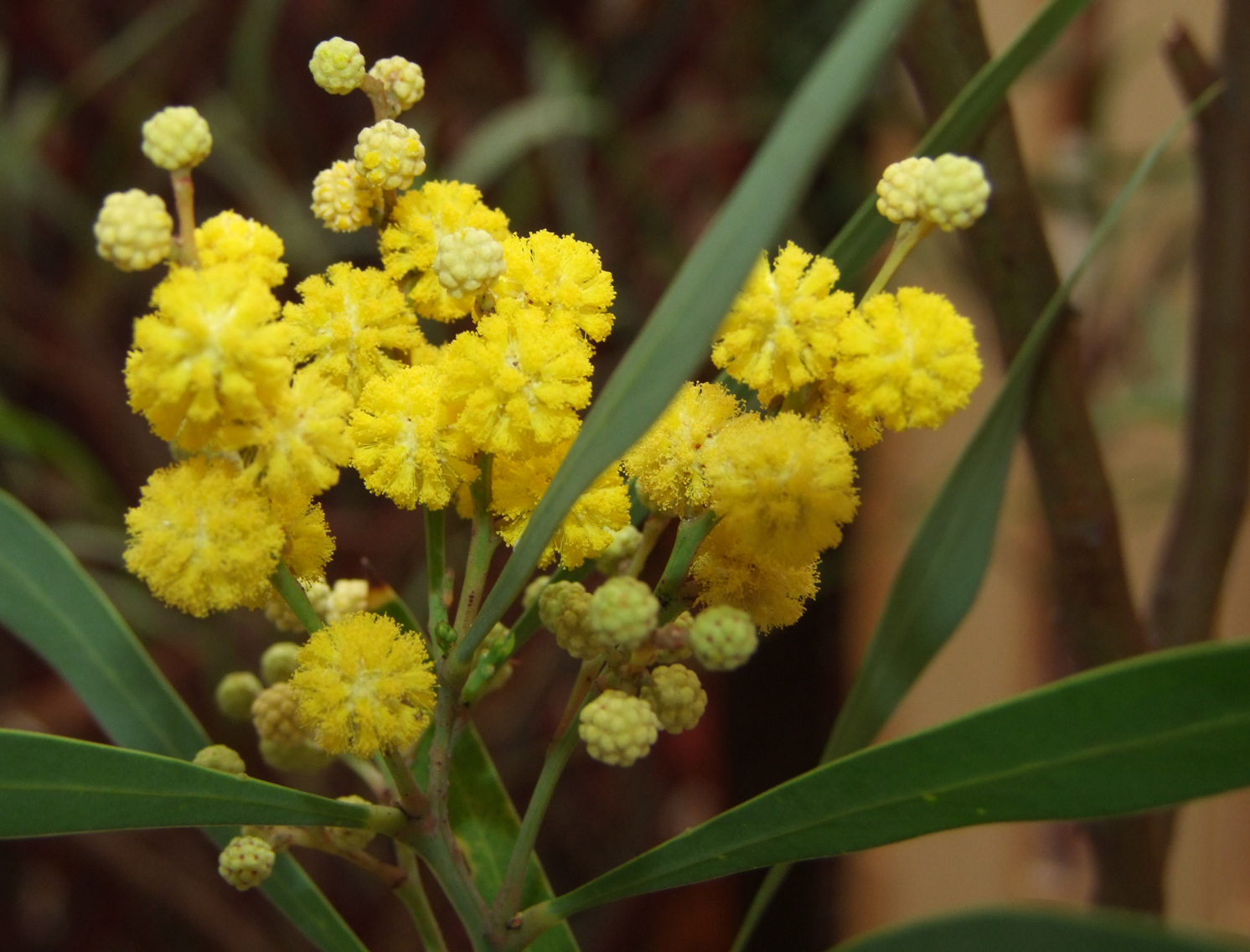
Flowers of Acacia retinodes

Acacia, commonly known as wattles or acacias, is a genus of about 1,084 species of shrubs and trees in the subfamily Mimosoideae of the pea family Fabaceae. Initially, it comprised a group of plant species native to Africa, South America, and Australasia, but is now reserved for species mainly from Australia, with others from New Guinea, Southeast Asia, and the Indian Ocean.

The genus name is Neo-Latin, borrowed from Koine Greek ἀκακία (akakia), a term used in antiquity to describe a preparation extracted from Vachellia nilotica, the original type species. Several species of Acacia have been introduced to various parts of the world, and two million hectares of commercial plantations have been established.

== Description ==
Plants in the genus Acacia are shrubs or trees with bipinnate leaves, the mature leaves sometimes reduced to phyllodes or rarely absent. There are 2 small stipules at the base of the leaf, but sometimes fall off as the leaf matures. The flowers are borne in spikes or cylindrical heads, sometimes singly, in pairs or in racemes in the axils of leaves or phyllodes, sometimes in panicles on the ends of branches. Each spike or cylindrical head has many small golden-yellow to pale creamy-white flowers, each with 4 or 5 sepals and petals, more than 10 stamens, and a thread-like style that is longer than the stamens. The fruit is a variably-shaped pod, sometimes flat or cylindrical, containing seeds with a fleshy aril on the end.

== Taxonomy ==
The genus was first validly named in 1754 by Philip Miller in The Gardeners Dictionary. In 1913 Nathaniel Lord Britton and Addison Brown selected Mimosa scorpioides L. (≡ Acacia scorpioides (L.) W.Wight = Acacia nilotica (L.) Delille), a species from Africa, as the lectotype of the name.

== Etymology ==
The genus name comes from Neo-Latin; Gaspard Bauhin in his book Pinax (1623) writes it coming from Dioscorides; the Koine term ἀκακία akakía is the name he uses for Vachellia nilotica, the original type species growing in Roman Egypt, from ἀκακίς akakis meaning "point".

The origin of "wattle" may be an proto-Germanic word meaning "to weave". First attested about 700, Old English: watul referred to the flexible woody vines, branches, and sticks which were interwoven to form walls, roofs, and fences. Since about 1810, it has been used as the common name for the Australian legume trees and shrubs such as Acacia species proper, Castanospermum australe, and Sesbania species that can provide these branches.

=== History ===
The genus Acacia was considered to contain some 1,352 species until 1986. That year, Leslie Pedley questioned the monophyletic nature of the genus, and proposed a split into three genera: Acacia sensu stricto (161 species), Senegalia (231 species) and Racosperma (960 species), the last name first proposed in 1829 by Carl Friedrich Philipp von Martius as the name of a section in Acacia, but raised to generic rank in 1835. In 2003, Pedley published a paper with 834 new combinations in Racosperma for species, most of which were formerly placed in Acacia. All but 10 of these species are native to Australasia, where it constitutes the largest plant genus.

In the early 2000s, it had become evident that the genus was not monophyletic and that several divergent lineages needed to be placed in separate genera. One lineage comprising over 900 species mainly native to Wallacea, Australia, New Guinea, and Indonesia was not closely related to the much smaller African lineage group containing the type species. This meant that the Australasian lineage, by far the most prolific in number of species, would need to be renamed. This led to a nomenclatural dispute among botanists over which lineage should retain the name Acacia. Proponents argued that conserving Acacia with a new type would minimize nomenclatural disruption by allowing the much larger, predominantly Australian lineage to retain the name. Whereas opponents argued that the original type should be retained under the normal principles of typification and priority, noting that the affected taxa were widely distributed across Africa, Asia, and the Americas and that the resulting name changes would impose disproportionate economic costs on developing countries.

Pedley's proposed name of Racosperma for this group had received little acclaim in the botanical community, especially by Australians. Australian botanists proposed a different solution, setting a different type species for Acacia, Acacia penninervis, allowing the largest number of species to remain in Acacia, resulting in the two pan-tropical lineages being renamed Vachellia and Senegalia, and the two endemic American lineages renamed Acaciella and Mariosousa.

In 2003, Anthony Orchard and Bruce Maslin filed a proposal to conserve the name Acacia with a different type, to retain the Australasian group of species in the genus Acacia. Following a controversial decision to choose a new type for Acacia in 2005, the Australian component of Acacia sensu lato now retains the name Acacia. At the 2011 International Botanical Congress held in Melbourne, Australia, the decision to use the name Acacia, rather than the proposed Racosperma for this genus, was upheld.

The Australian species of the genus Paraserianthes s.l., namely P. Iophantha, are deemed its closest relatives. The nearest relatives of Acacia and Paraserianthes s.l. in turn include the Australian and Southeast Asian genera Archidendron, Archidendropsis, Pararchidendron and Wallaceodendron, all Mimosoideae.

=== Species ===
The names of more than 1,080 species of Acacia, mostly native to Australia, have been accepted by Plants of the World Online as of January 2025.

== Fossil record ==
An Acacia-like 14 cm (5.5 in) long fossil seed pod has been described from the Eocene of the Paris Basin. Acacia-like fossil pods under the name Leguminocarpon are known from late Oligocene deposits at different sites in Hungary. Seed pod fossils of †Acacia parschlugiana and †Acacia cyclosperma are known from Tertiary deposits in Switzerland. †Acacia colchica has been described from the Miocene of Georgia west of the Likhi Range. Pliocene fossil pollen of an Acacia species has been described from western Georgia, including Abkhazia.

Australia's oldest fossil Acacia pollen are recorded from the late Oligocene, 25 million years ago.

== Distribution and habitat ==
Species of Acacia occur in all Australian states and territories, and on its nearby islands. About 20 species occur naturally outside Australia and 7 of these also occur in Australia. Two species (Acacia koa and Acacia koaia) are native to Hawaii and one (Acacia heterophylla) is native to Mauritius and Réunion in the Indian Ocean.

They are present in all terrestrial habitats, including alpine settings, rainforests, woodlands, grasslands, coastal dunes and deserts. In drier woodlands or forests they are an important component of the understory. Elsewhere they may be dominant, as in the Brigalow Belt, Myall woodlands and the eremaean Mulga woodlands.

In Australia, Acacia forest is the second most common forest type after eucalypt forest, covering 980,000 square kilometres (378,380 sq mi) or 8% of total forest area. Acacia is also the nation's largest genus of flowering plants with almost 1,000 species found.

== Ecology ==
Acacia is a common food source and host plant for butterflies of the genus Jalmenus. The imperial hairstreak, Jalmenus evagoras, feeds on at least 25 acacia species. Many reptiles feed on the sap, such as the native house gecko in Australia. The sap is also consumed by bugs (Hemiptera), such as Hackerobrachys viridiventris and Sextius virescens.

== Acacia as an invasive species ==
=== South Africa ===
At least 16 Acacia species introduced to South Africa are categorised as invasive. In 1847, Acacia species were introduced to stabilise coastal dunes. In 1864 A. mearnsii was planted for its tannins; it has now become the most widespread invasive alien tree in South Africa.

Most are classified as highly invasive, Category 1a or 1b invaders. This means that most activities with regards to the species are prohibited (such as importing, propagating, introducing, translocating or trading) and it should be ensured that species exempted for an existing plantation does not spread beyond its domain.

- Acacia adunca
- Acacia baileyana
- Acacia cyclops
- Acacia dealbata
- Acacia decurrens
- Acacia elata
- Acacia fimbriata
- Acacia implexa
- Acacia longifolia
- Acacia mearnsii
- Acacia melanoxylon
- Acacia paradoxa
- Acacia podalyriifolia
- Acacia pycnantha
- Acacia saligna
- Acacia stricta

== Toxicity ==
Some species of acacia contain psychoactive alkaloids, and some contain potassium fluoroacetate.

== Uses ==
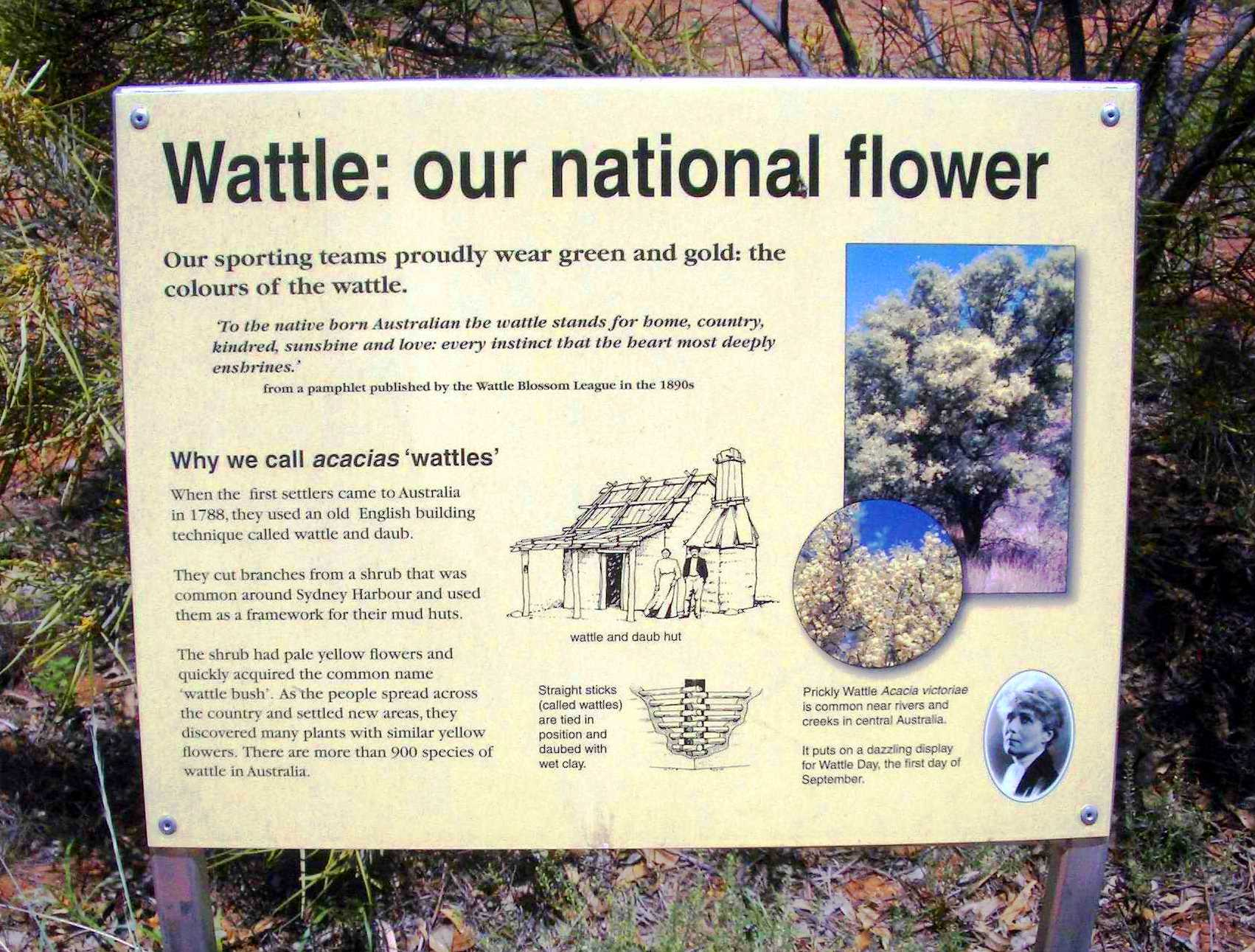
Wattle sign at Olive Pink Botanic Garden, Alice Springs, Australia in 2005

The seed pods, flowers, and young leaves are generally edible either raw or cooked.

Aboriginal Australians have traditionally harvested the seeds of some species, to be ground into flour and eaten as a paste or baked into a cake. Wattleseeds contain as much as 25% more protein than common cereals, and they store well for long periods due to the hard seed coats. In addition to consuming the edible seed and gum, Aboriginal people also employed the timber for implements, weapons, fuel and musical instruments. A number of species, most notably Acacia mangium (hickory wattle), A. mearnsii (black wattle) and A. saligna (coojong), are economically important and are widely planted globally for wood products, tannin, firewood and fodder. A. melanoxylon (blackwood) and A. aneura (mulga) supply some of the most attractive timbers in the genus. Black wattle bark supported the tanning industries of several countries, and may supply tannins for production of waterproof adhesives.

In Vietnam, Acacia is used in plantations of non-native species that are regularly clear-cut for paper or timber uses.

Wattle bark collected in Australia in the 19th century was exported to Europe where it was used in the tanning process. One ton of wattle or mimosa bark contained about 68 kilograms (150 pounds) of pure tannin.

The gum of some species may be used as a substitute for gum arabic, known as Australian gum or wattle gum.

=== Cultivation ===
Some species of acacia – notably Acacia baileyana, A. dealbata and A. pravissima – are cultivated as ornamental garden plants. The 1889 publication Useful Native Plants of Australia describes various uses for eating.
