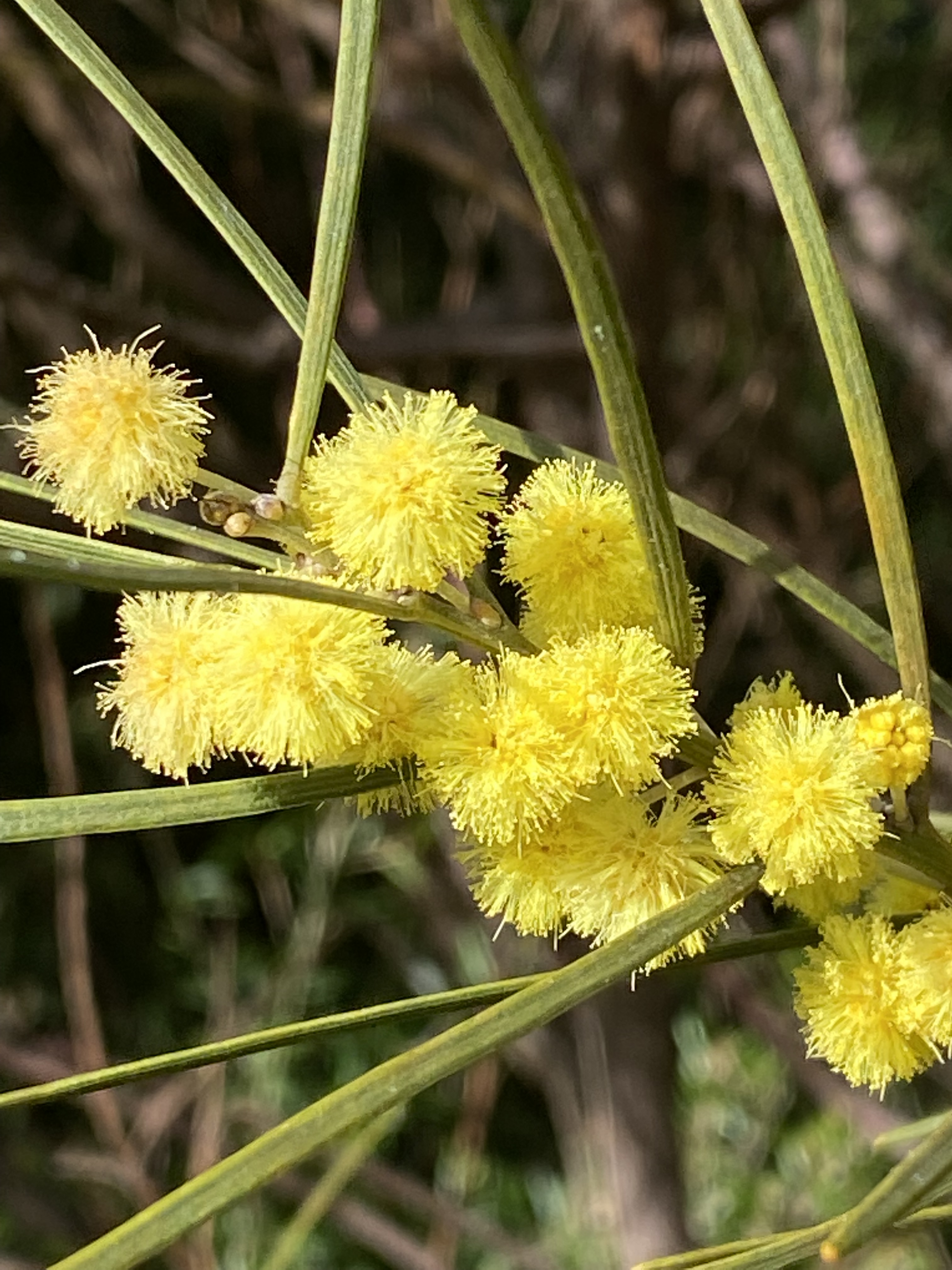

Scientific classification
- Kingdom: Plantae
- Clade: Tracheophytes
- Clade: Angiosperms
- Clade: Eudicots
- Clade: Rosids
- Order: Fabales
- Family: Fabaceae
- Subfamily: Caesalpinioideae
- Clade: Mimosoid clade
- Genus: Acacia
- Species: A. elongata

Binomial name
- Acacia elongata Sieber ex. DC.
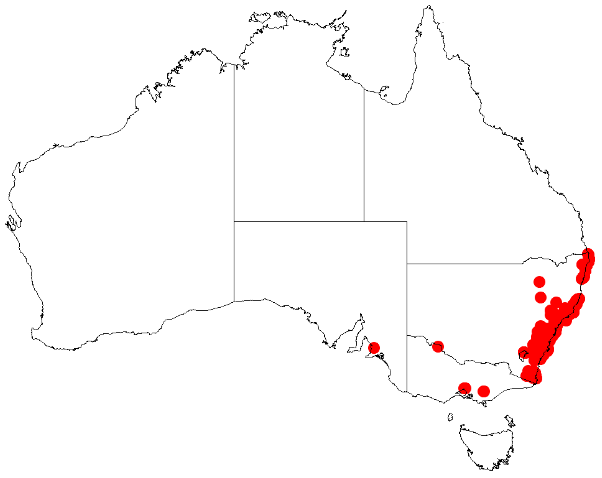
- Occurrence data from AVH

Synonyms
- Acacia elongata var. dilatata Maiden & Blakely; Acacia elongata Sieber ex DC. var. elongata; Acacia elongata var. hebecephala Benth.; Acacia elongata var. typica Domin nom. inval.; Acacia hebecephala A.Cunn. ex Loudon nom. inval., nom. nud.; Racosperma elongatum (Sieber ex DC.) Pedley

= Acacia elongata =

Swamp wattle

Species of legume

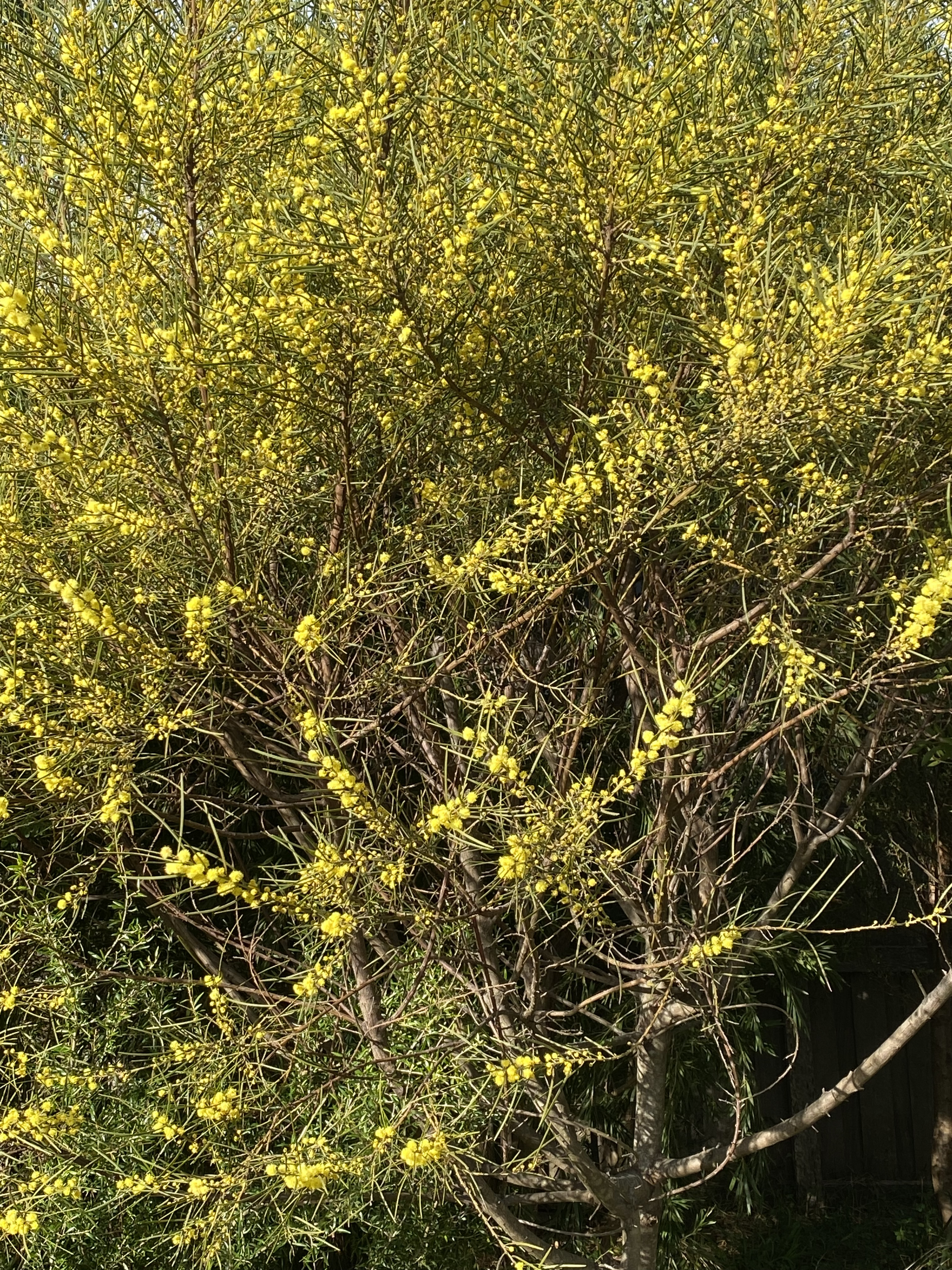
Habit

Acacia elongata, also known as swamp wattle or slender wattle, is a species of flowering plant in the family Fabaceae and is endemic to New South Wales. It is a shrub with linear, thinly leathery phyllodes, spherical heads of light golden yellow flowers and linear, thinly leathery pods.

== Description ==
Acacia elongata is an erect or spreading shrub that typically grows to a height of up to 5 m (16 ft), and has yellow-ribbed branchlets, sometimes with minute hairs pressed against the surface. Its phyllodes are rigid, linear to narrowly lance-shaped with the narrower end towards the base, straight to slightly curved, usually 50–160 mm (2.0–6.3 in) long and 24 mm (0.94 in) wide. The phyllodes are thinly leathery with 3 raised veins and a small gland near the base.

The flowers are borne in two or three spherical heads in racemes 1–14 mm (0.039–0.551 in) long on peduncles 5–16 mm (0.20–0.63 in) long, each head 5 mm (0.20 in) in diameter with 20 to 42 light golden yellow flowers. Flowering occurs from July to October, and the pods are linear, straight, thinly leathery and glabrous, up to 90 mm (3.5 in) long, 3.5–6 mm (0.14–0.24 in) wide and strongly raised over the seeds. The seeds are broadly elliptic to oblong, 3–4 mm (0.12–0.16 in) long and glossy dark brown with an aril on the end.

== Taxonomy ==
Acacia elongata was first formally described in 1825 by the botanist Augustin Pyramus de Candolle in his Prodromus Systematis Naturalis Regni Vegetabilis from an unpublished description by Franz Sieber. It is closely related to A. ptychoclada and superficially resembles A. trinervata, A. dawsonii and A. viscidula. The specific epithet is taken from the Latin word elongatus meaning lengthened in reference to the long, narrow phyllodes.

== Distribution ==
Swamp wattle occurs in north-eastern New South Wales from near Kingscliff, south to near Eden and inland to Wagga Wagga in the west. It grows along watercourses and swamps in sandy soil in woodland and heath. The species has become naturalized in a few places in the Australian Capital Territory and Victoria.

== Use in horticulture ==
Although it is not a widely cultivated species, smaller forms are sometime found in gardens. They grow quickly and flower within one or two years from seed. It is able to grow in a range of soils so long as they are reasonably moist and will manage in either full sun or dappled shade. It can be propagated by seed but requires pretreatment scarification or by soaking in boiling water. The shrub is suitable for poorly drained areas, will tolerate light frosts and salt spray.

== See also ==
- List of Acacia species
