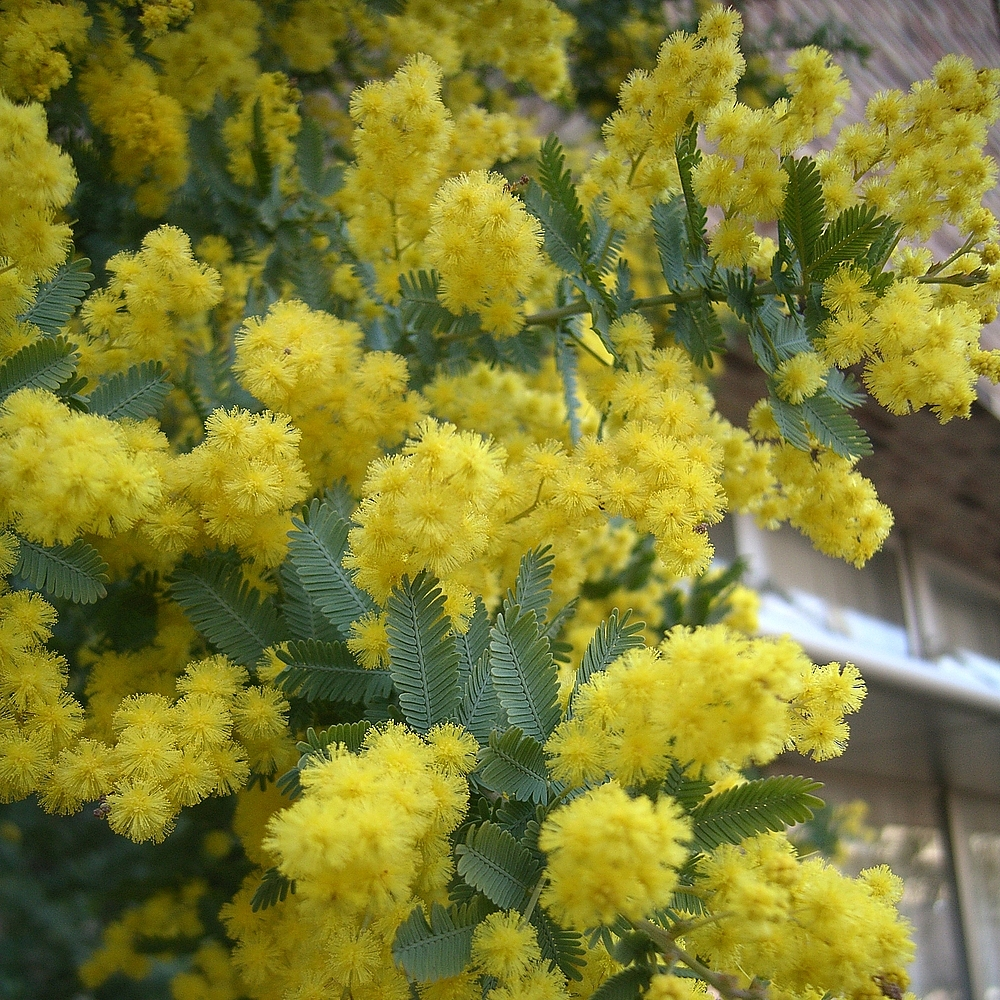

Scientific classification
- Kingdom: Plantae
- Clade: Tracheophytes
- Clade: Angiosperms
- Clade: Eudicots
- Clade: Rosids
- Order: Fabales
- Family: Fabaceae
- Subfamily: Caesalpinioideae
- Clade: Mimosoid clade
- Genus: Acacia
- Species: A. baileyana

Binomial name
- Acacia baileyana F.Muell.

Synonyms
- Acacia baileyana var. aurea Pescott; Acacia baileyana F.Muell. var. baileyana; Racosperma baileyanum (F.Muell.) Pedley

= Acacia baileyana =

Cootamundra wattle

Species of shrub

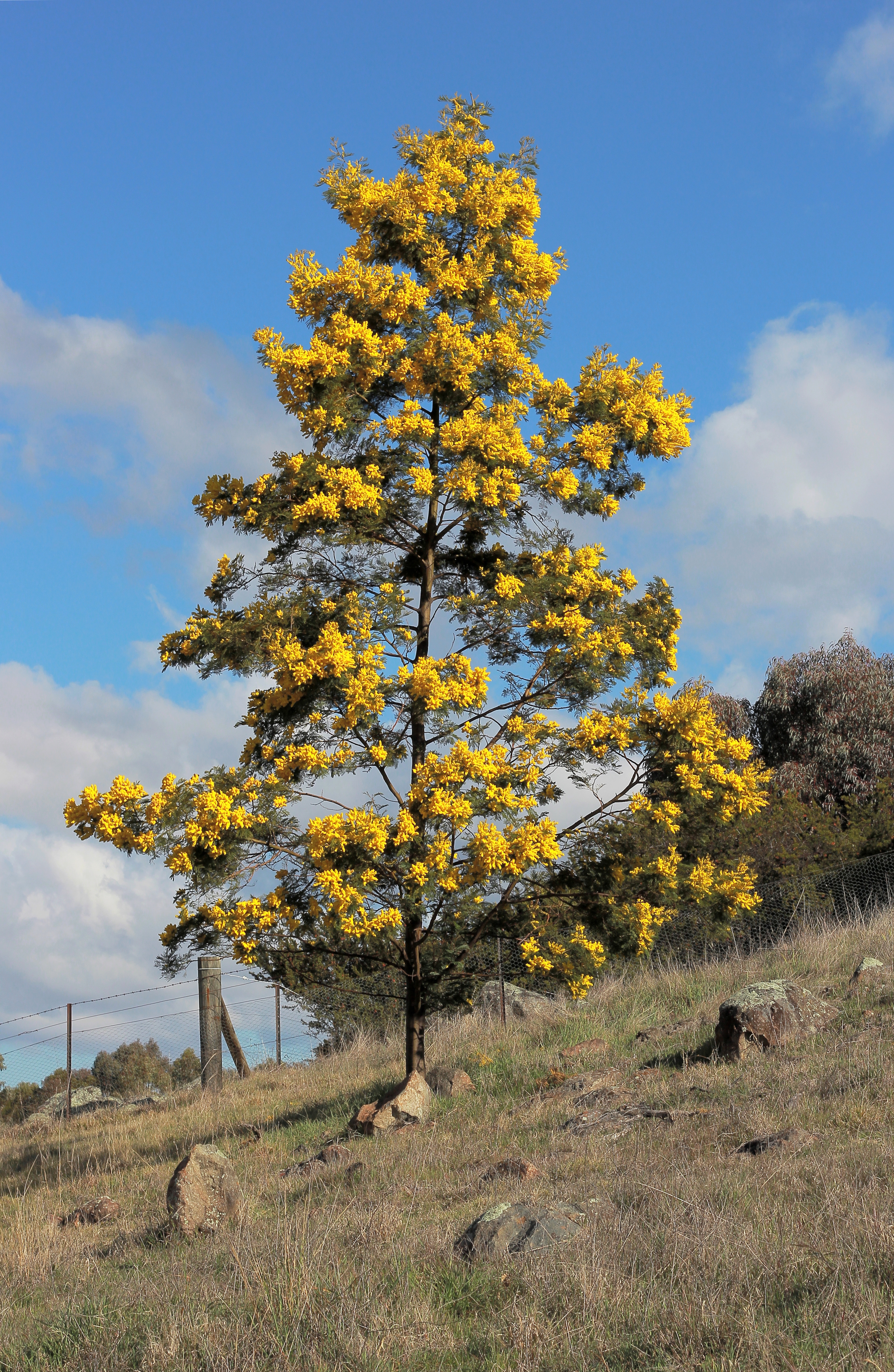
Habit in Canberra

Acacia baileyana, commonly known as Cootamundra wattle, Bailey's wattle or golden mimosa, is a species of flowering plant in the family Fabaceae and is endemic to a restricted area of New South Wales, although it has become naturalised in other parts of Australia. It is a shrub or tree with smooth bark, bipinnate leaves with mostly two to four pairs of oblong to narrowly oblong leaflets, spherical heads of bright yellow flowers arranged in 8 to 36 racemes in leaf axils, and straight, leathery pods up to 100 mm (3.9 in) long.

== Description ==
Acacia baileyana is a shrub or tree that typically grows to a height of 3–10 m (9.8–32.8 ft) and has smooth, grey or brown bark. Its leaves are more or less sessile, somewhat leathery, glaucous with mostly two to four pairs of oblong to narrowly oblong pinnae 5–8 mm (0.20–0.31 in) long and 0.7–1.0 mm (0.028–0.039 in) wide. The flowers are borne in spherical heads in racemes in leaf axils, 30–100 mm (1.2–3.9 in) long and much longer than the leaves. The heads are on peduncles 3–7 mm (0.12–0.28 in) long, each head 3.5–7 mm (0.14–0.28 in) long with 11 to 25 bright yellow to golden flowers. Flowering occurs from June to September and the pods are leathery, straight, more or less flat and straight-sided, 30–100 mm (1.2–3.9 in) long and 7.5–15 mm (0.30–0.59 in) wide.

== Taxonomy ==
Acacia baileyana was first formally described in 1888 by Ferdinand von Mueller on the Transactions and Proceedings of the Royal Society of Victoria. The specific epithet (baileyana) honour Frederick Manson Bailey, who sent the type specimens to von Mueller.

== Distribution and habitat ==
Cootamundra wattle is endemic to the Temora-Cootamundra district where it grows in open forest, woodland and mallee in stony soils on creek flats and hilly country.

Acacia baileyana is often naturalised on roadsides, along railways in disturbed bushland and in urban areas in all mainland states of Australia. and is an environmental weed in some places.

== Uses ==
Acacia baileyana is used in Europe in the cut flower industry. It is also used as food for bees in the production of honey. American urban landscape designer Renée Gunter uses this plant in her South Los Angeles lawn as a drought-resistant alternative to thirstier plants.

== Use in horticulture ==
This plant is adaptable and easy to grow. It has gained the Royal Horticultural Society's Award of Garden Merit. Unfortunately, it has an ability to naturalise (i.e. escape) into surrounding bushland. Also, it hybridises with some other wattles, notably the rare and endangered Sydney Basin species Acacia pubescens.

A prostrate weeping form is in cultivation. Its origin is unknown, but it is a popular garden plant, with its cascading horizontal branches good for rockeries. The fine foliage of the original Cootamundra wattle is grey-green, but a blue-purple foliaged form, known as 'Purpurea' is very popular.

== Gallery ==
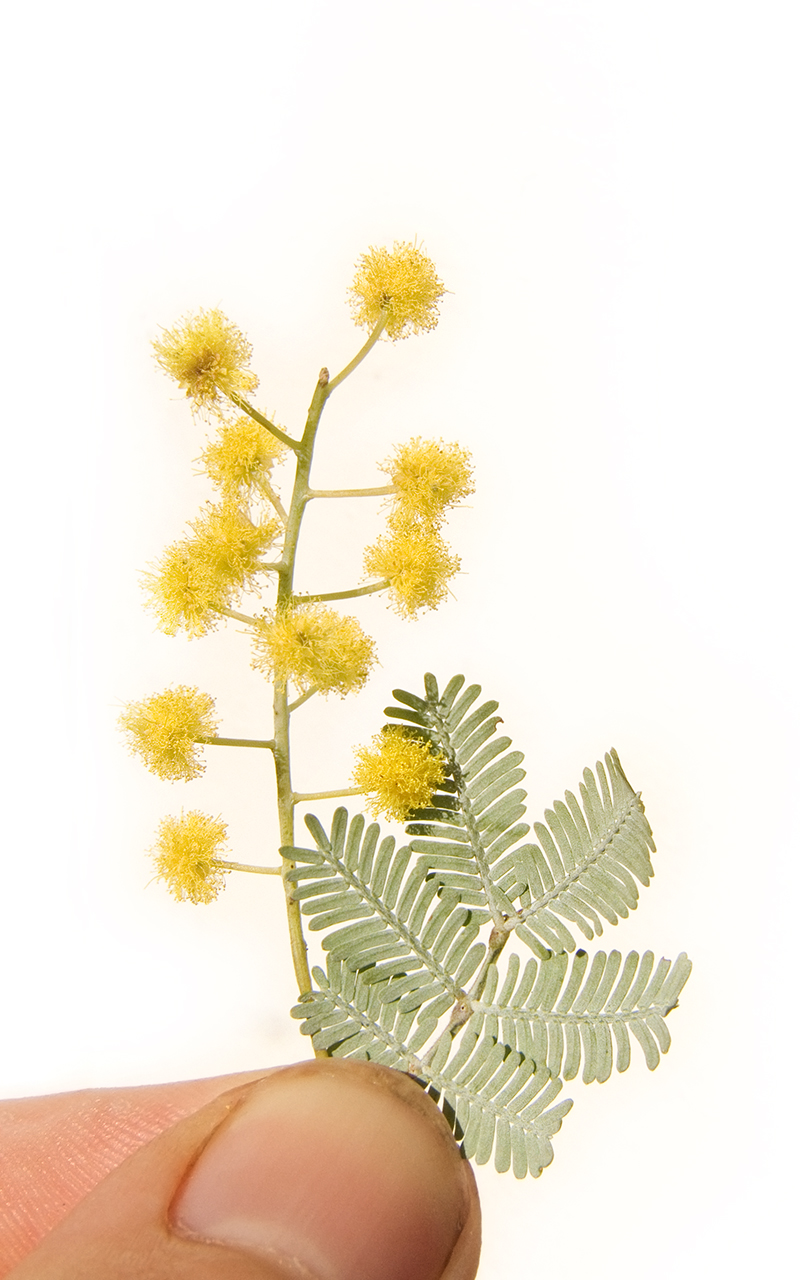
Leaf and blossom

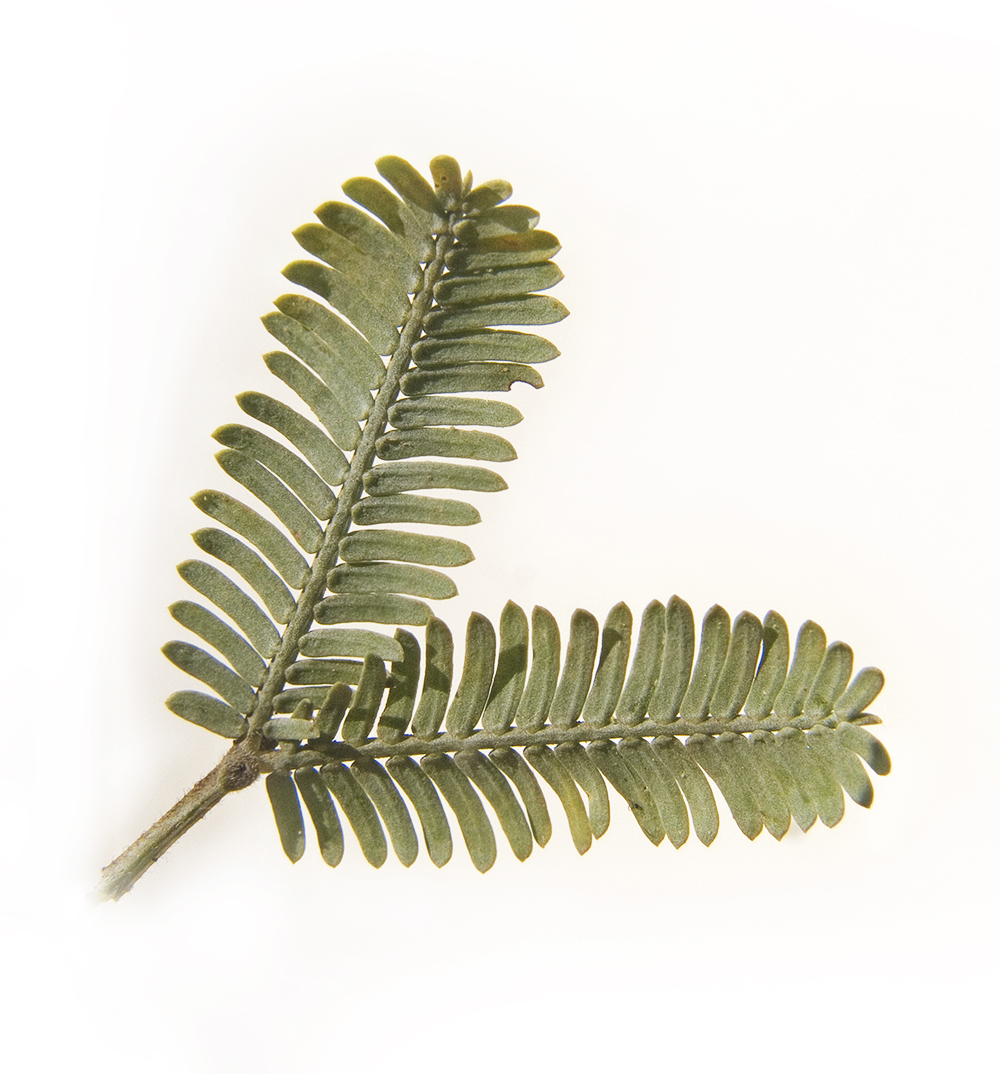
Fine detail of leaf

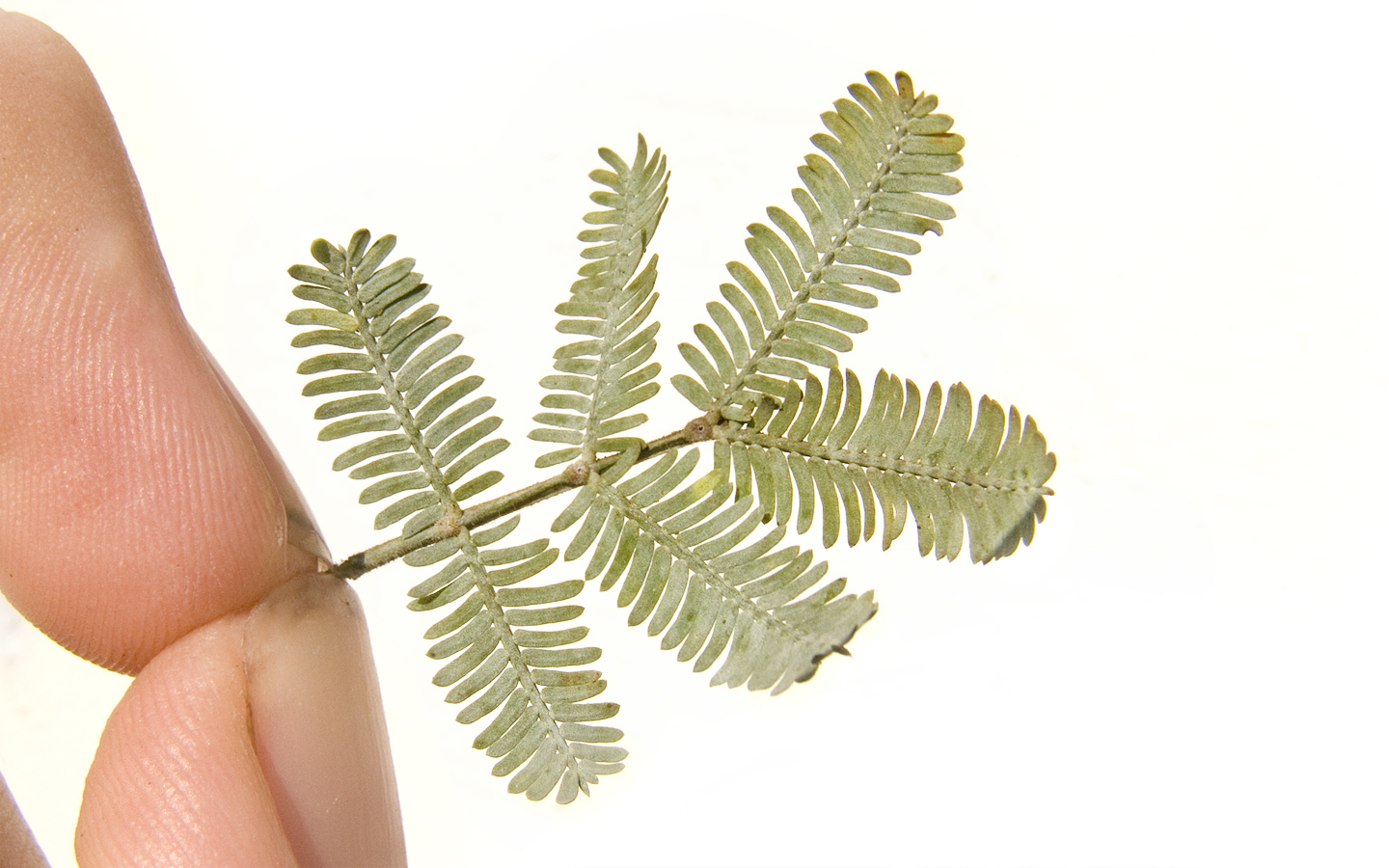
Leaf with fingers for scale

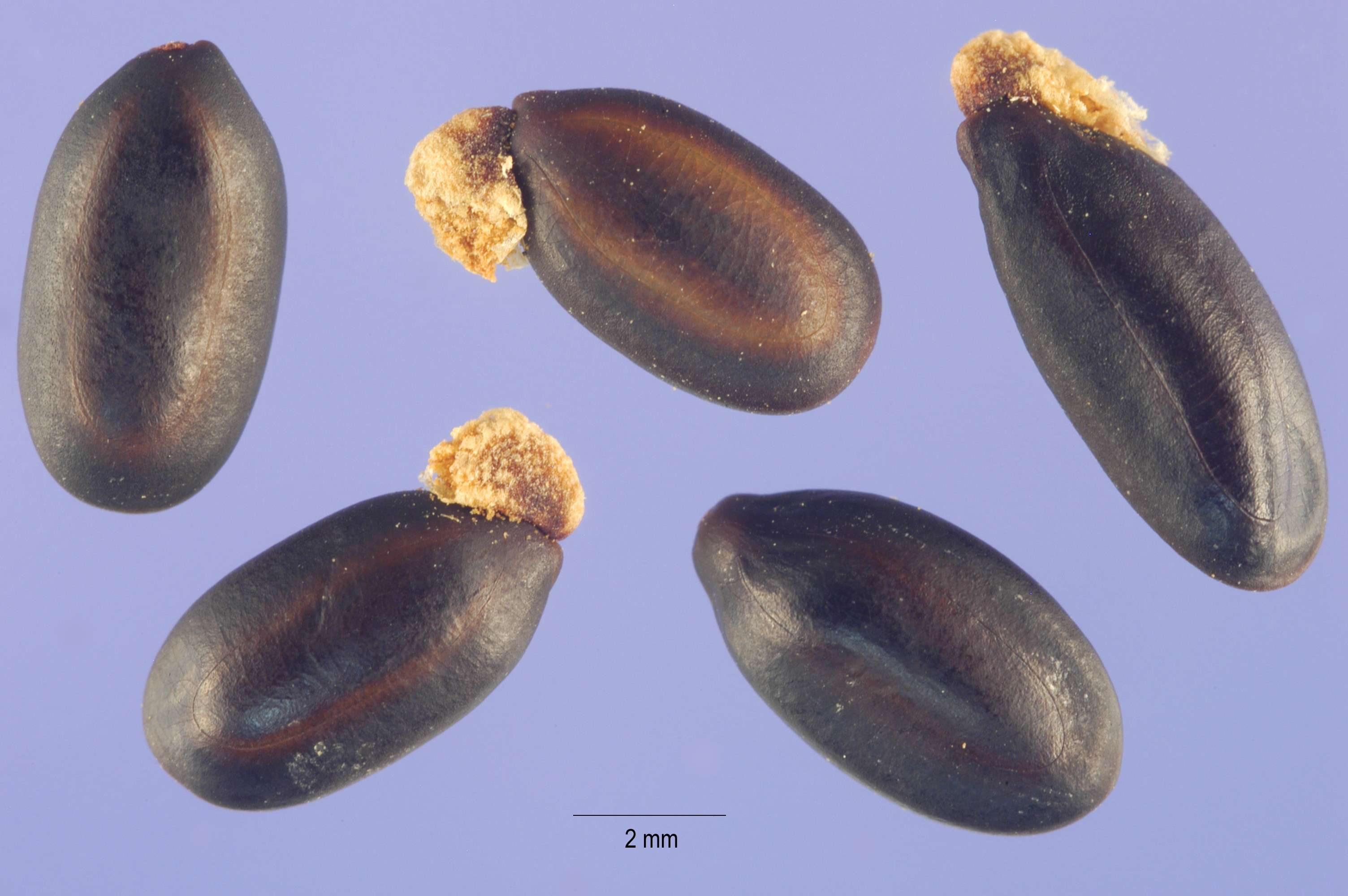
Seeds

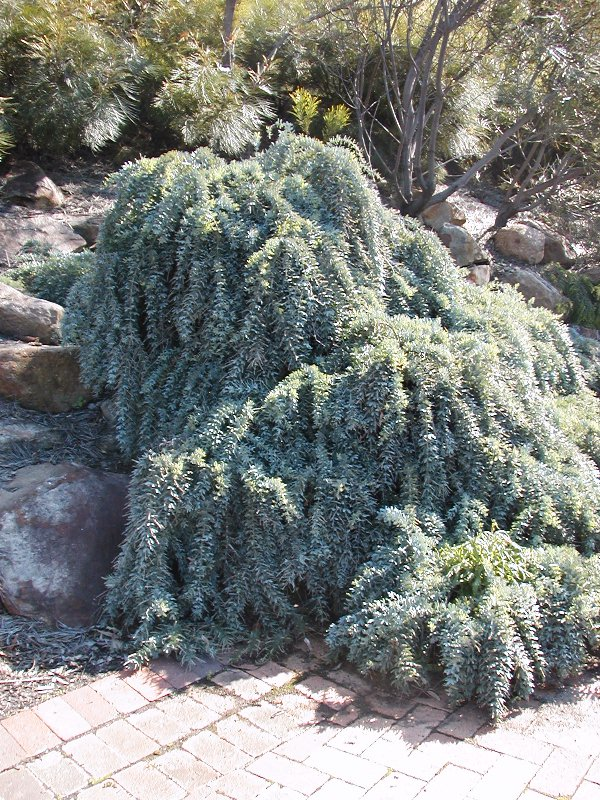
Prostrate form in cultivation, Illawarra Grevillea Park

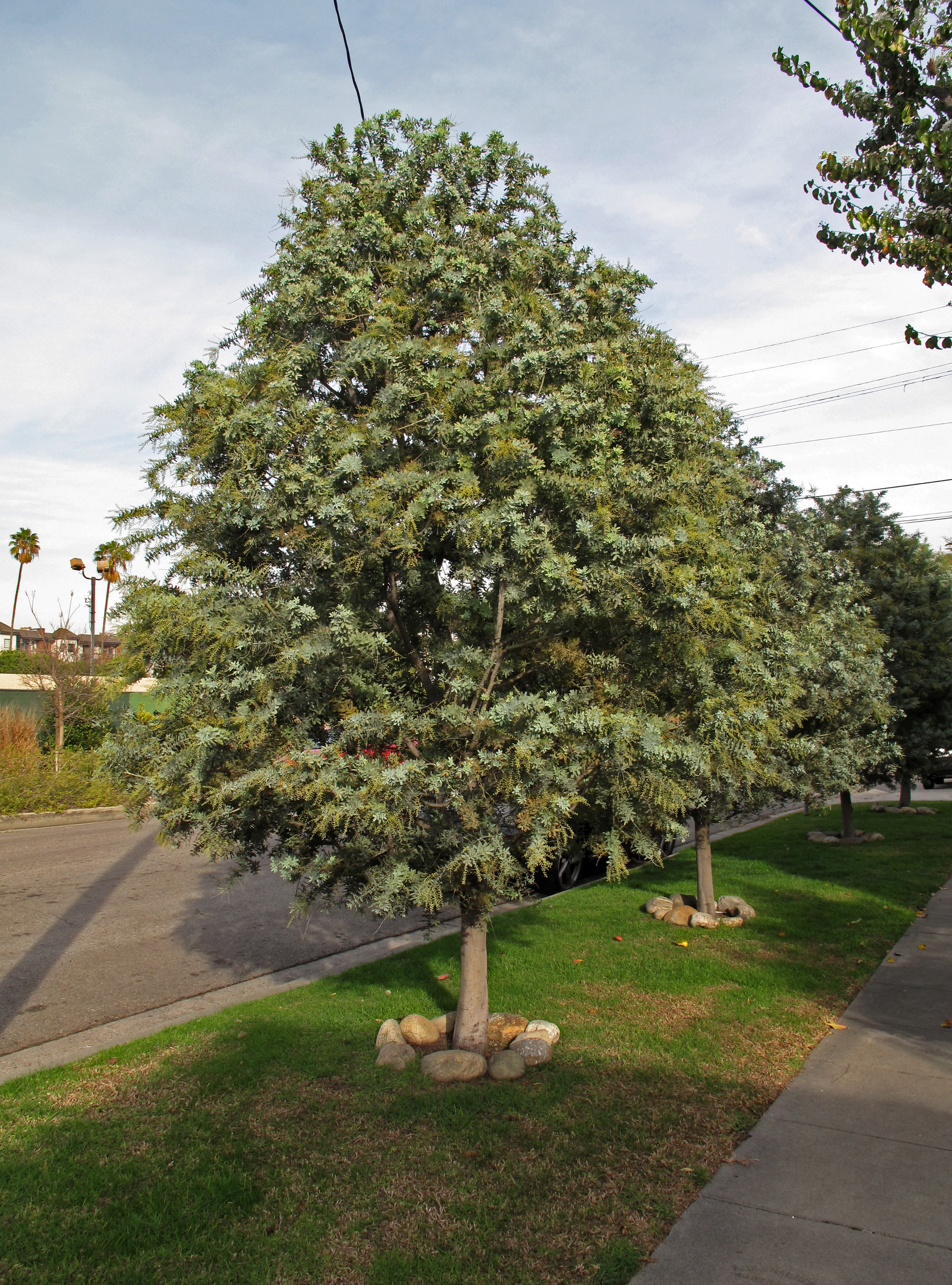
Street tree, Los Angeles

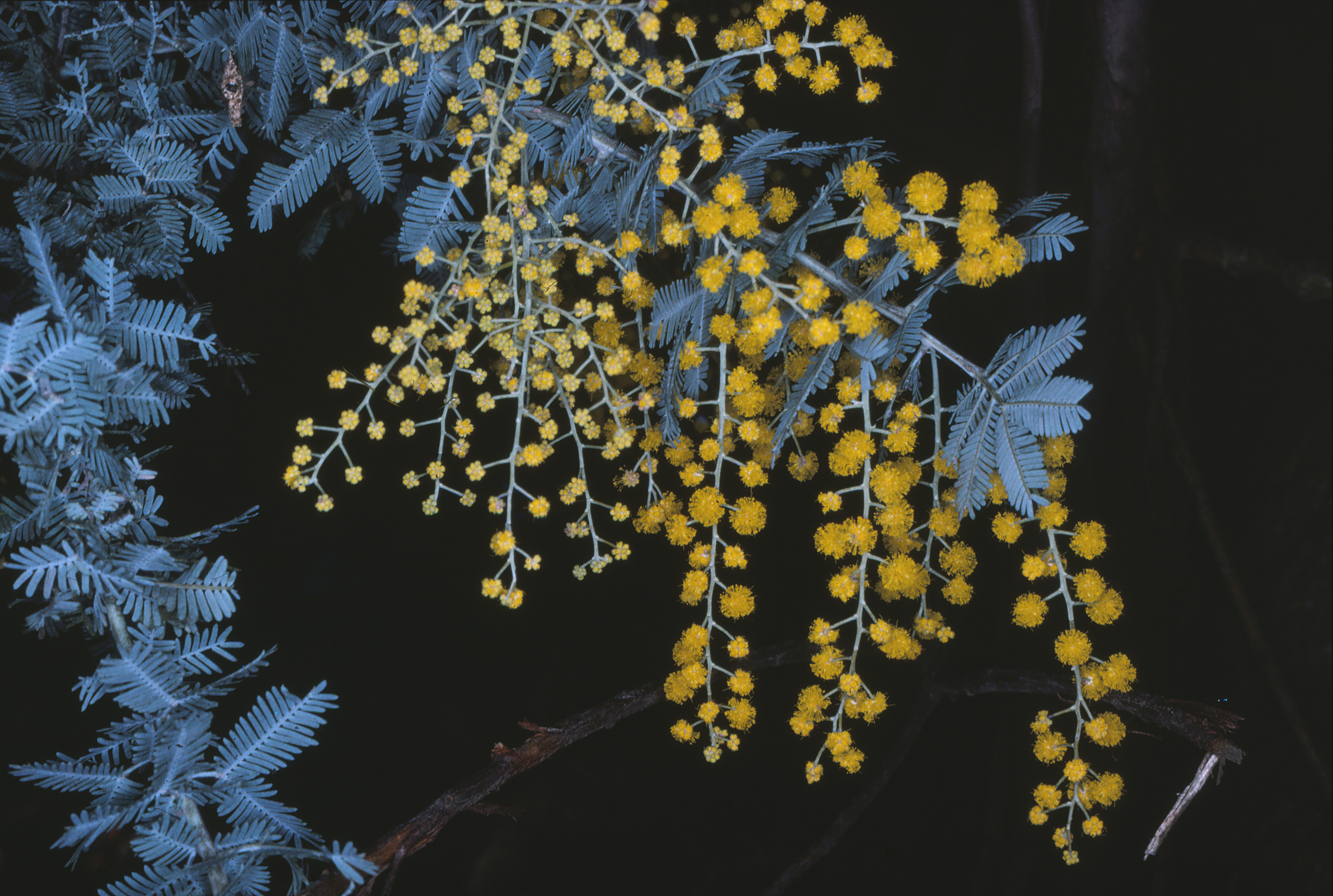
Inflorescences and foliage
