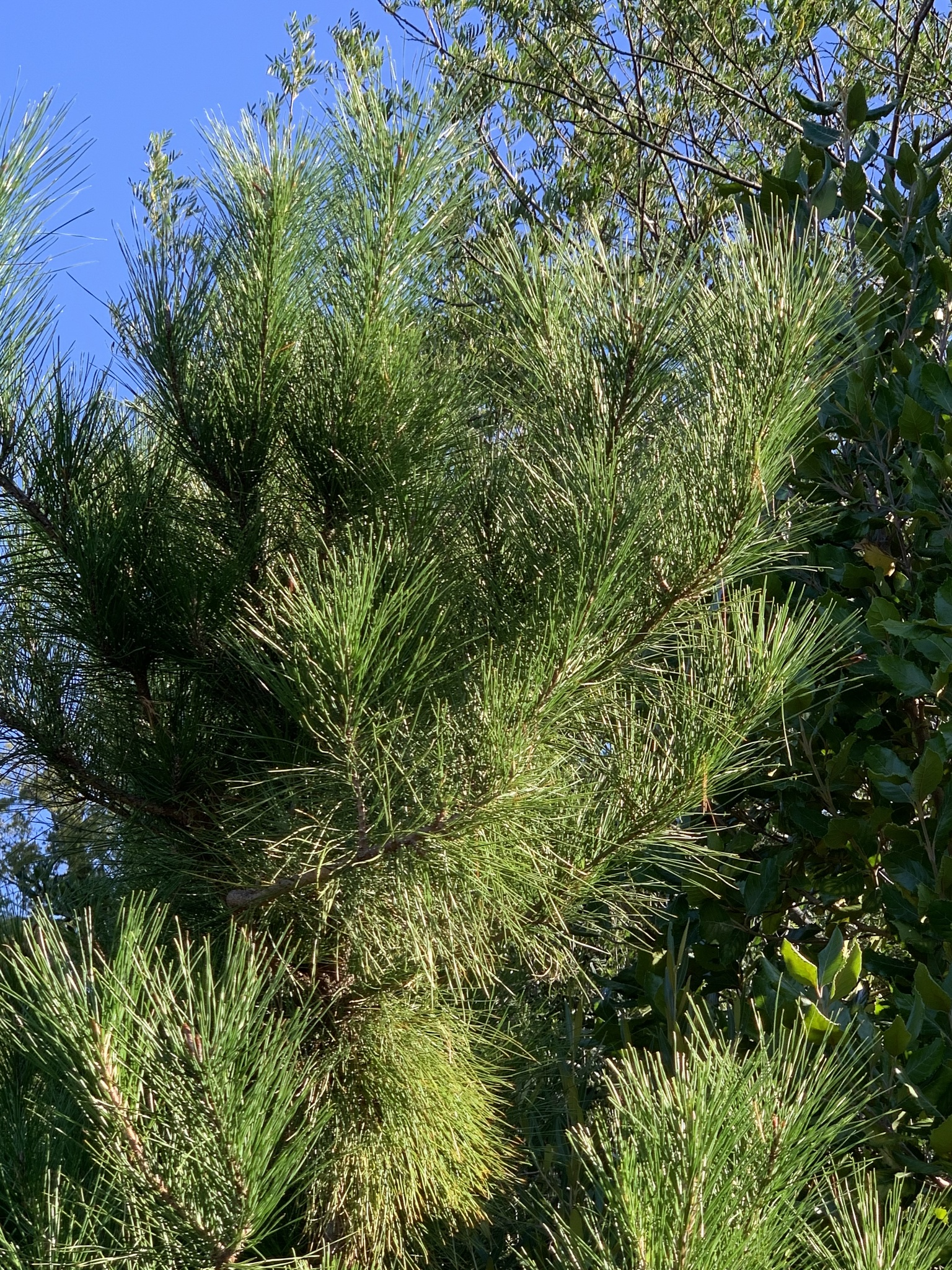

Scientific classification
- Kingdom: Plantae
- Clade: Tracheophytes
- Clade: Angiosperms
- Clade: Eudicots
- Clade: Rosids
- Order: Fabales
- Family: Fabaceae
- Subfamily: Caesalpinioideae
- Clade: Mimosoid clade
- Genus: Acacia
- Species: A. viscidula

Binomial name
- Acacia viscidula Benth.
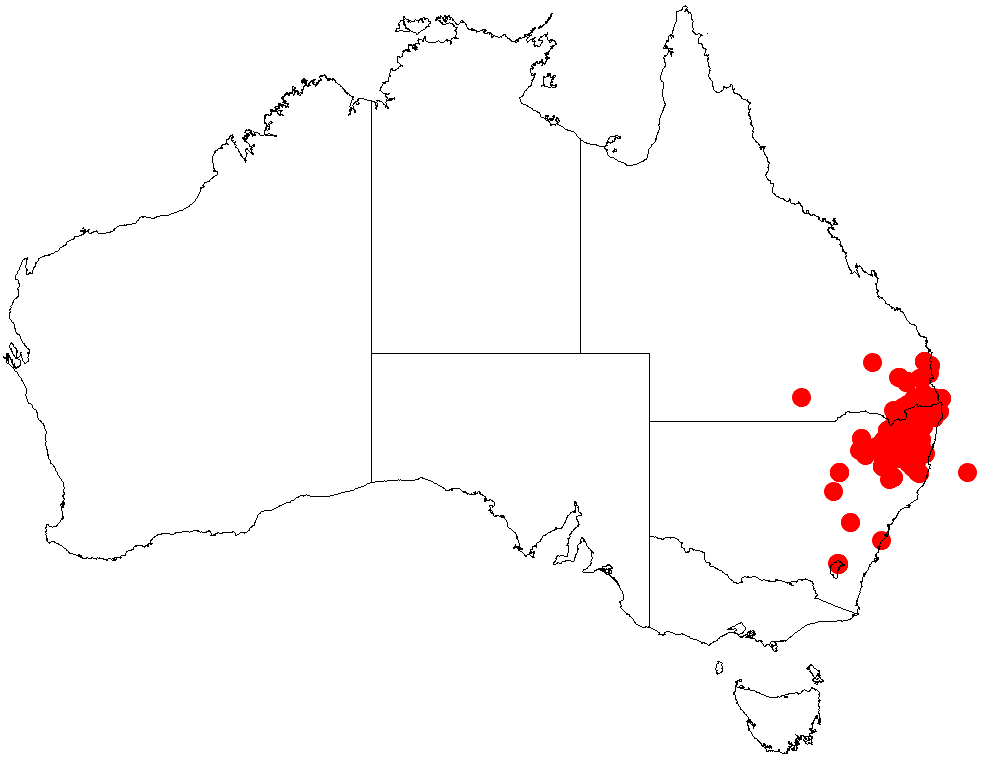
- Occurrence data from AVH

= Acacia viscidula =

Sticky wattle

Species of legume

Acacia viscidula, also known as sticky wattle, is a shrub of the genus Acacia and the subgenus Plurinerves that is endemic to an area of eastern Australia.

== Description ==
The shrub typically grows to a height of 1 to 4 m (3 ft 3 in to 13 ft 1 in) or occasionally to 5 to 6 m (16 to 20 ft) and a width of about 4 m (13 ft) and has an erect or spreading habit with smooth, grey or grey-brown coloured bark and angled to flattened, resinous and hairy branchlets that have ribbed. Like most species of Acacia it has phyllodes rather than true leaves. The ascending, thin, hairy or glabrous and evergreen phyllodes have a linear shape that can be slightly incurved with a length of 4 to 8 cm (1.6 to 3.1 in) and a width of 1 to 3 mm (0.039 to 0.118 in) and have three to seven impressed, distant and resinous nerves. It blooms between August and October producing simple inflorescences that occur singly or in pairs in the axils with spherical flower-heads that have a diameter of 4 to 7 m (13 to 23 ft) and contain 15 to 35 light to bright yellow coloured flowers. The firmly papery and hairy seed pods that form after flowering are usually straight but can be slightly curved and are raised alternately over each of the seeds and sometimes a little constricted between some seeds. The pods have a length of 2 to 7 cm (0.79 to 2.76 in) and a width of 2 to 3 mm (0.079 to 0.118 in) and contain longitudinally arranged seeds.

== Taxonomy ==
The species was first formally described by the botanist George Bentham in 1842 as a part of the William Jackson Hooker work Notes on Mimoseae, with a synopsis of species as published in the London Journal of Botany. It was reclassified as Racosperma viscidulum in 1987 by Leslie Pedley then transferred back to genus Acacia in 2006. The specific epithet is in reference to the sticky or viscid nature of the plant. It has a similar appearance to Acacia lanigera which is found further south and also resembles Acacia dawsonii.

== Distribution ==
The is found in the Darling Downs region of south eastern Queensland and eastern parts of New South Wales. In Queensland the range extends as far west as Injune and in New South Wales as far west as around Coonabarabran where it is found un upland areas with granite based soils and is usually a part of low woodland communities along with species of Eucalyptus and other Acacias. In New South Wales it is mostly located in the Tablelands Region from around Tamworth in the south out to Mount Kaputar National Park in the west and to around Tenterfield in the west where it is usually part of dry sclerophyll forest communities or among the heath in crevices of granite outcrops.

== Cultivation ==
The plant is available commercially in seedling or in seed form. The seeds have to be treated with boiling water before sowing. Growing by propagation of cuttings should be possible. It is useful as a screen or as an informal hedge. It can be quite dense making it a suitable nesting sites for small native birds. It is fast growing, will tolerate full sun or partial shade, can tolerate a light frost, is drought tolerant once established and prefers well-drained soil.

== See also ==
- List of Acacia species
