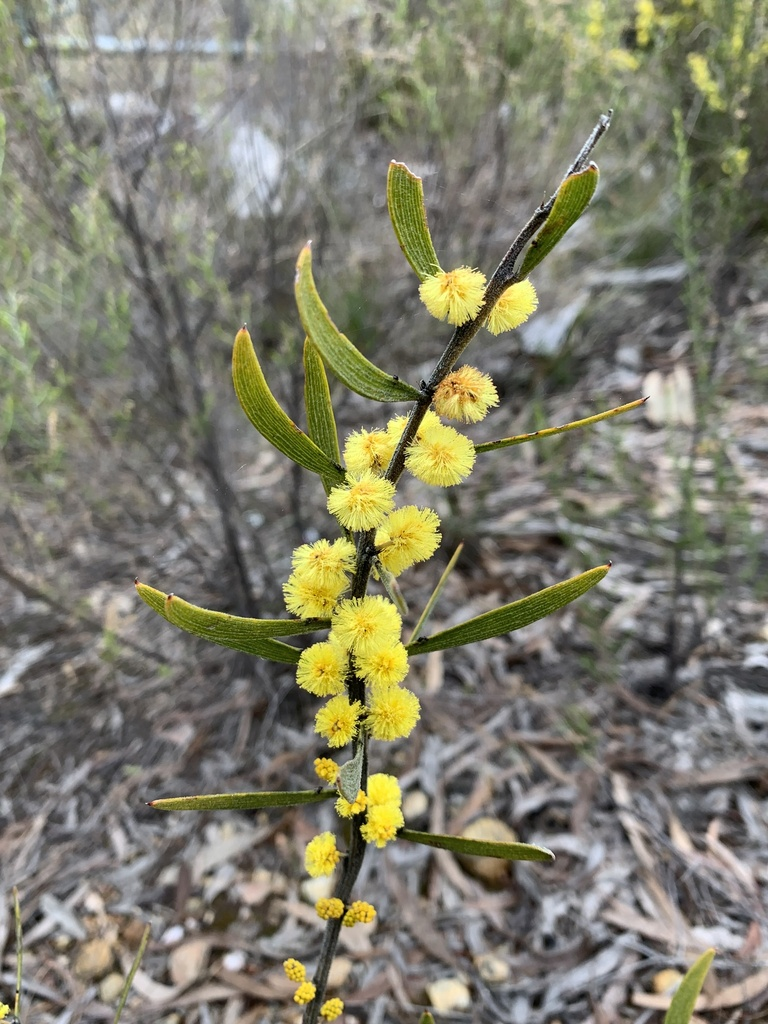
- In the Wambool Nature Reserve near Yetholme

Scientific classification
- Kingdom: Plantae
- Clade: Embryophytes
- Clade: Tracheophytes
- Clade: Spermatophytes
- Clade: Angiosperms
- Clade: Eudicots
- Clade: Rosids
- Order: Fabales
- Family: Fabaceae
- Subfamily: Caesalpinioideae
- Clade: Mimosoid clade
- Genus: Acacia
- Species: A. lanigera

Binomial name
- Acacia lanigera A.Cunn.
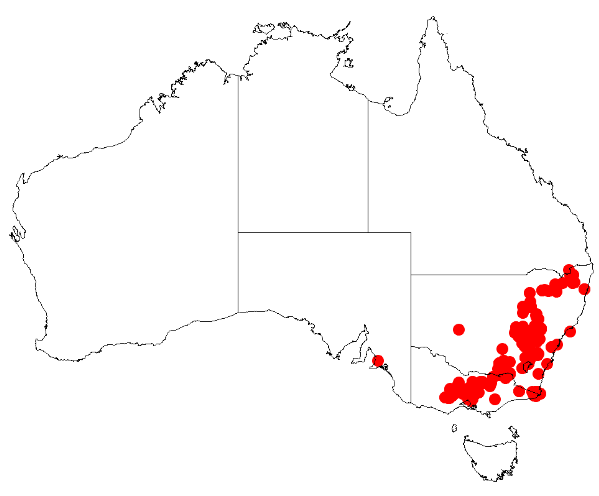
- Occurrence data from AVH

Synonyms
- Acacia lanigera var. brachyphylla Domin; Drepaphyla lanigera (A.Cunn.) Raf.; Racosperma lanigerum (A.Cunn.) Pedley

= Acacia lanigera =

Woolly wattle

Species of legume

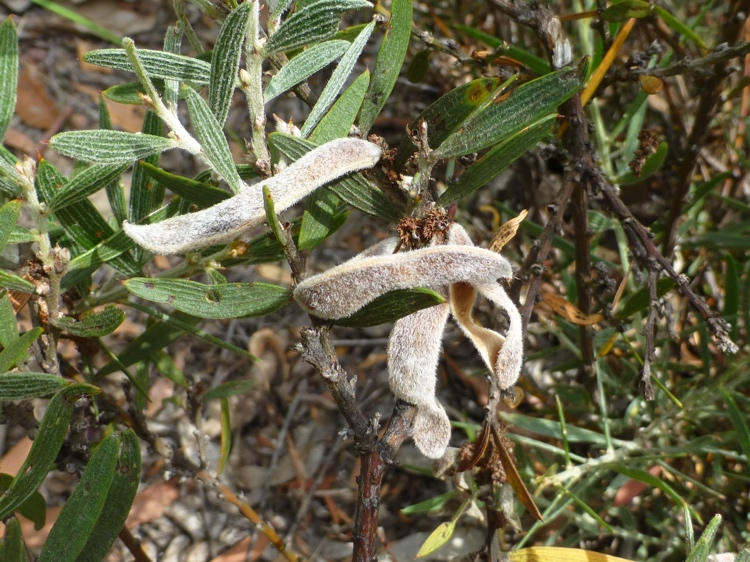
Woolly seed pods

Acacia lanigera, commonly known as woolly wattle or hairy wattle, is a species of flowering plant in the family Fabaceae and is endemic to the south-east of continental Australia. It is a rigid shrub with hairy branchlets, leathery, narrowly elliptic, linear or lance-shaped phyllodes with the narrower end towards the base, spherical to oblong heads of golden yellow flowers, and linear, curved to coiled, leathery pods covered with shaggy or woolly hairs.

== Description ==
Acacia lanigera is a rigid shrub that typically grows to a height of 1–2 m (3 ft 3 in – 6 ft 7 in) and has hairy branchlets. The phyllodes are narrowly elliptic, linear or lance-shaped with the narrower end towards the base, straight to slightly curved, usually 30–55 mm (1.2–2.2 in) long and 3–7 mm (0.12–0.28 in) wide, leathery and sometimes sharply pointed with three or four main veins and a gland up to 13 mm (0.51 in) above the pulvinus. The flowers are usually borne in a single spherical to oblong head in axils on a peduncle 2–9 mm (0.079–0.354 in) long, the heads 5–7 mm (0.20–0.28 in) long and 4.5–6.5 mm (0.18–0.26 in) in diameter with 20 to 30 golden yellow flowers. Flowering occurs from May to October, and the pods are linear, curved to openly coiled, up to 100 mm (3.9 in) long and 4–6 mm (0.16–0.24 in) wide, leathery and covered with shaggy or woolly hairs. The seeds are oblong to broadly elliptic, 4.5–5.0 mm (0.18–0.20 in) long, dull dark brown with an aril on the end.

== Taxonomy ==
Acacia lanigera was first formally described in 1825 by Allan Cunningham in Barron Field's Geographical Memoirs on New South Wales. The specific epithet (lanigera) refers means 'wool-bearing' and refers to the hairs on the plant.

In 1864, George Bentham described two varieties of A. lanigera and in 1914, Edward Edgar Pescott described a third, and the names are accepted by the Australian Plant Census:

- Acacia lanigera var. gracilipes Benth. has peduncles 6–9 mm (0.24–0.35 in) long and narrowly elliptic phyllodes with a gland at, or near the base of the leaf blade.
- Acacia lanigera A.Cunn. var. lanigera has peduncles 2–4 mm (0.079–0.157 in) long and phyllodes narrowly elliptic or linear-elliptic.
- Acacia lanigera var. whanii (F.Muell. ex Benth.) Pescott, previously known as Acacia whanii F.Muell. ex Benth. has peduncles 2–4 mm (0.079–0.157 in) long and phyllodes linear lance-shaped, with the narrower end towards the base.

== Distribution and habitat ==
The species occurs in New South Wales, Victoria and the Australian Capital Territory. Varieties gracilipes and lanigera occur in both states and the A.C.T., var. gracilipes usually growing among granite boulders in open forest or shrubland, var. lanigera widespread south from near Coonabarabran to the north-east of Victoria, where it grows on and granite hills in shallow stony or sand soils. Variety whanii is restricted to Victoria, where it is widespread through to centre of that state from Skipton to Licola.

== Use in horticulture ==
The species prefers a well-drained sunny situation and will tolerate frosts down to −7 Celsius. It is adaptable to use in situations where maintenance is infrequent such as road batters.
