= Renée Gunter =

American landscape designer

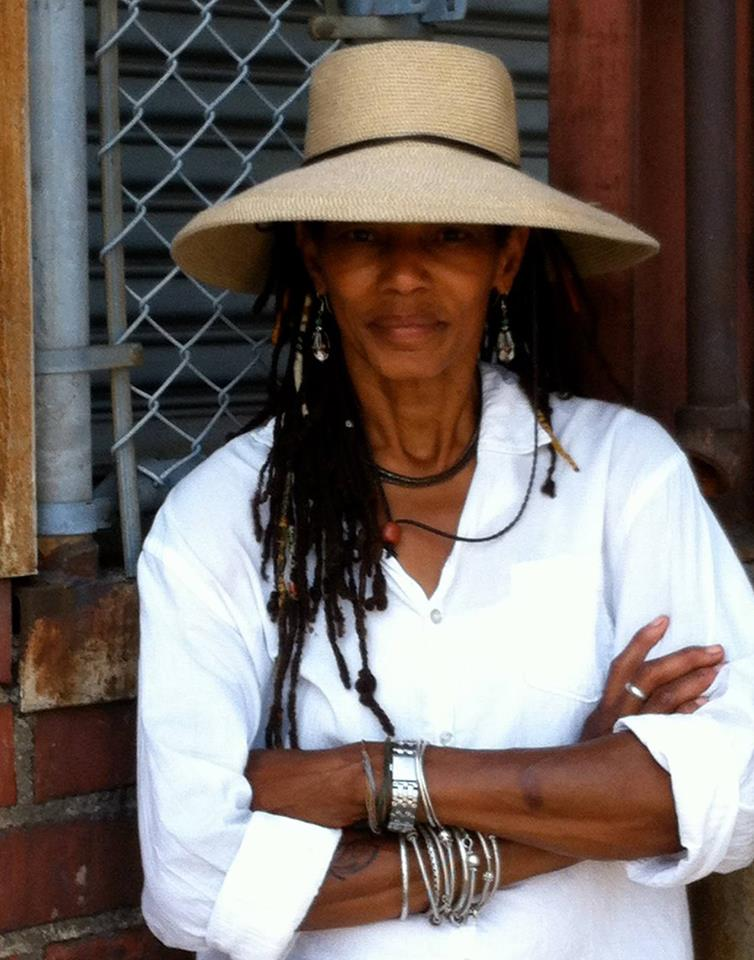
- Born: c. 1952 (age 73–74); Los Angeles, California
- Education: UCLA
- Occupation: Landscape designer

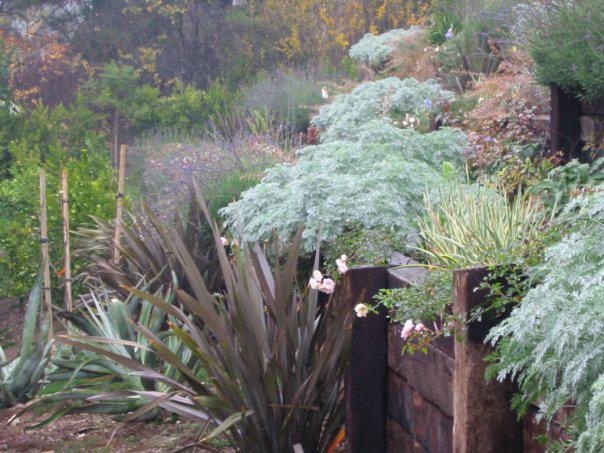
Gunter uses drought-resistant plants in her landscape designs.

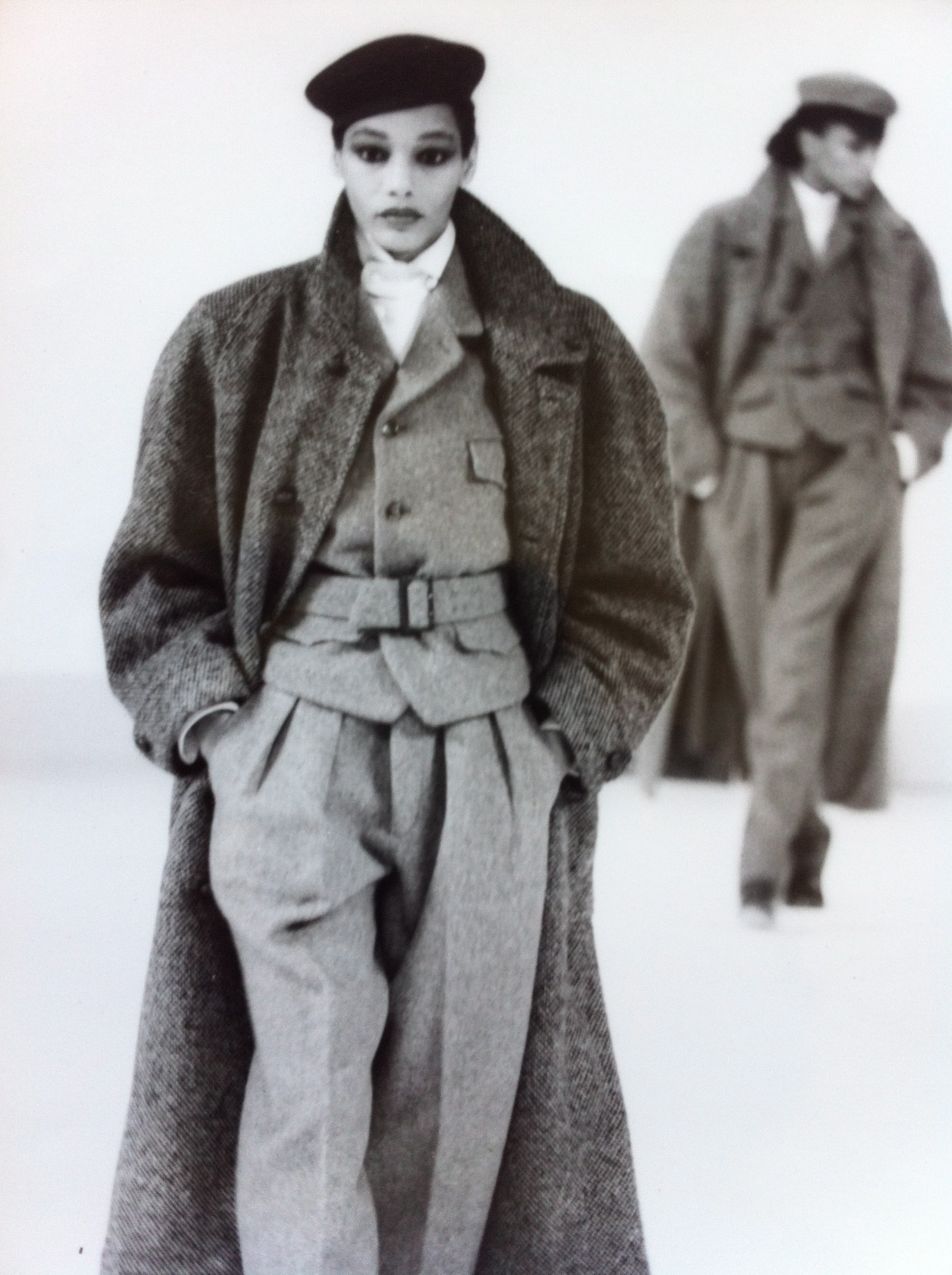
Modeling haute couture circa early 1980s.

Renée Gunter (born c. 1952) is an American landscape designer based in Los Angeles, California. She is notable for drought-tolerant gardens.

Her garden was profiled by ABC News for its water conservation ability during an extended drought for the region. Gunter designed and restored several local neighborhood gardens and parks, and began a landscape firm called Urbanscapes. On one assignment, she asked what the client wanted from a front yard, and to meet the needs of water conservation, beauty, and privacy, Gunter recycled a fence, mounded organic earth strategically to elevate selected areas, and planted large drought-resistant plants to make the house almost invisible from many perspectives to form a "kind of private park". She encourages neighbors to conserve water while organizing large block parties to build community ties. Gunter uses plant groups acclimatized for low water consumption; drought-resistant plants at her own garden include Agave weberi (syn. A. neglecta) and Acacia baileyana along with other grasses and ground covers, and features a dry 'riverbed' in the middle for walking. Her yard has been described as the only "certified wildlife habitat" in southern Los Angeles. Her conservation efforts have been lauded publicly by water officials. In 2013 she also launched a mobile organic produce service called "DO! Daily Organics", delivering fruits and vegetables to residents of South Los Angeles, with a storefront built from a discarded shipping container.

Gunter grew up in South Los Angeles, attended UCLA and majored in psychology, went to Europe, and worked as a runway model for Yves St. Laurent and André Courrèges in Japan and Paris and Italy for seven years before returning to her native city. During the 1990s she designed clothing for Cross Colors.

== Photo gallery ==
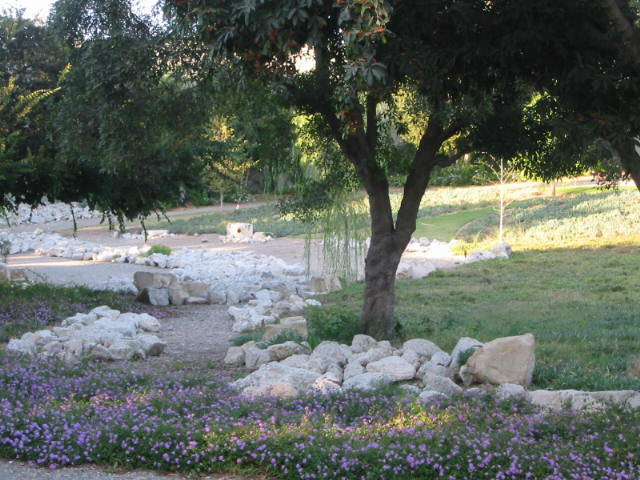
Community 'pocket park'

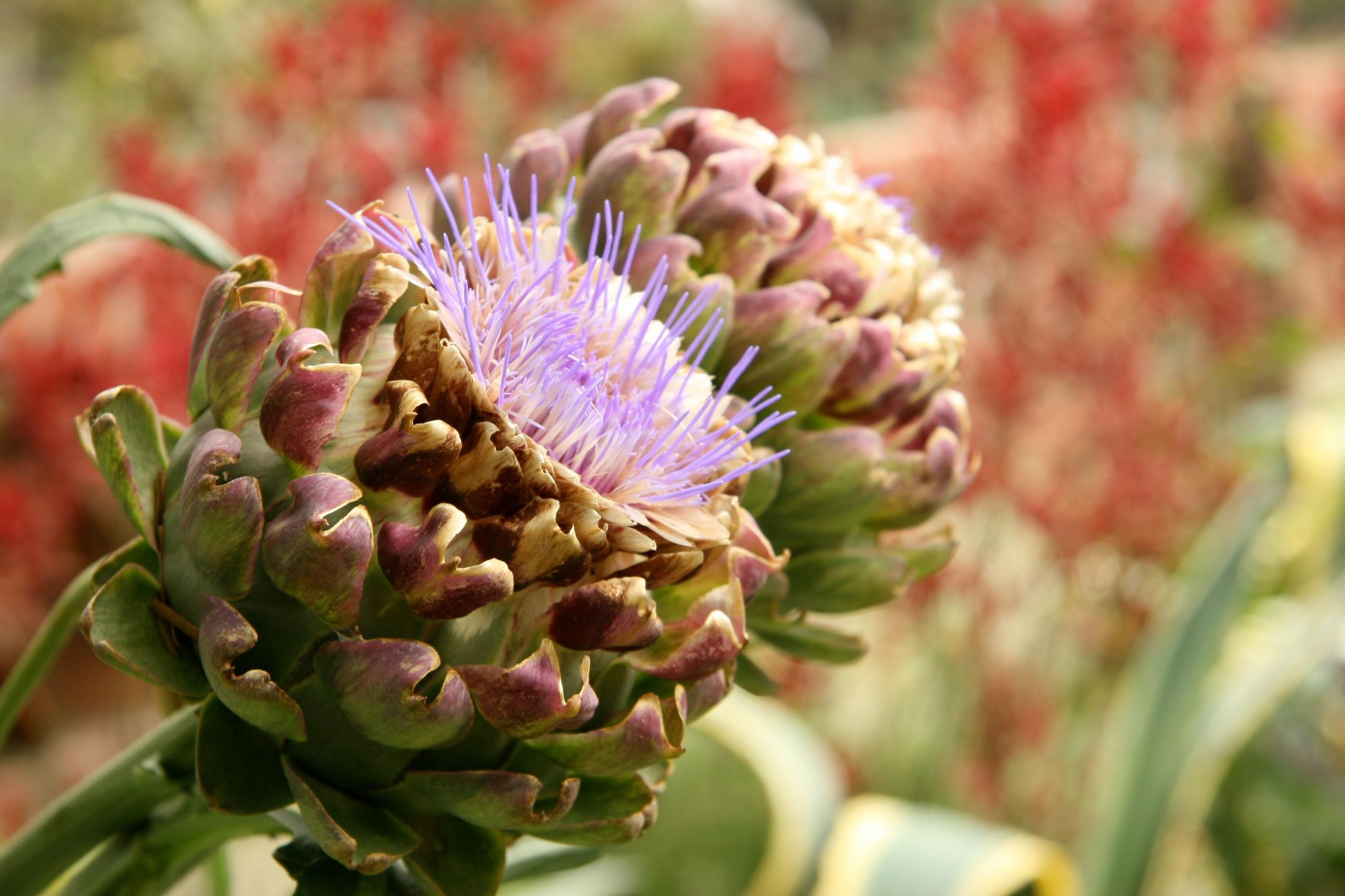
Artichoke plants

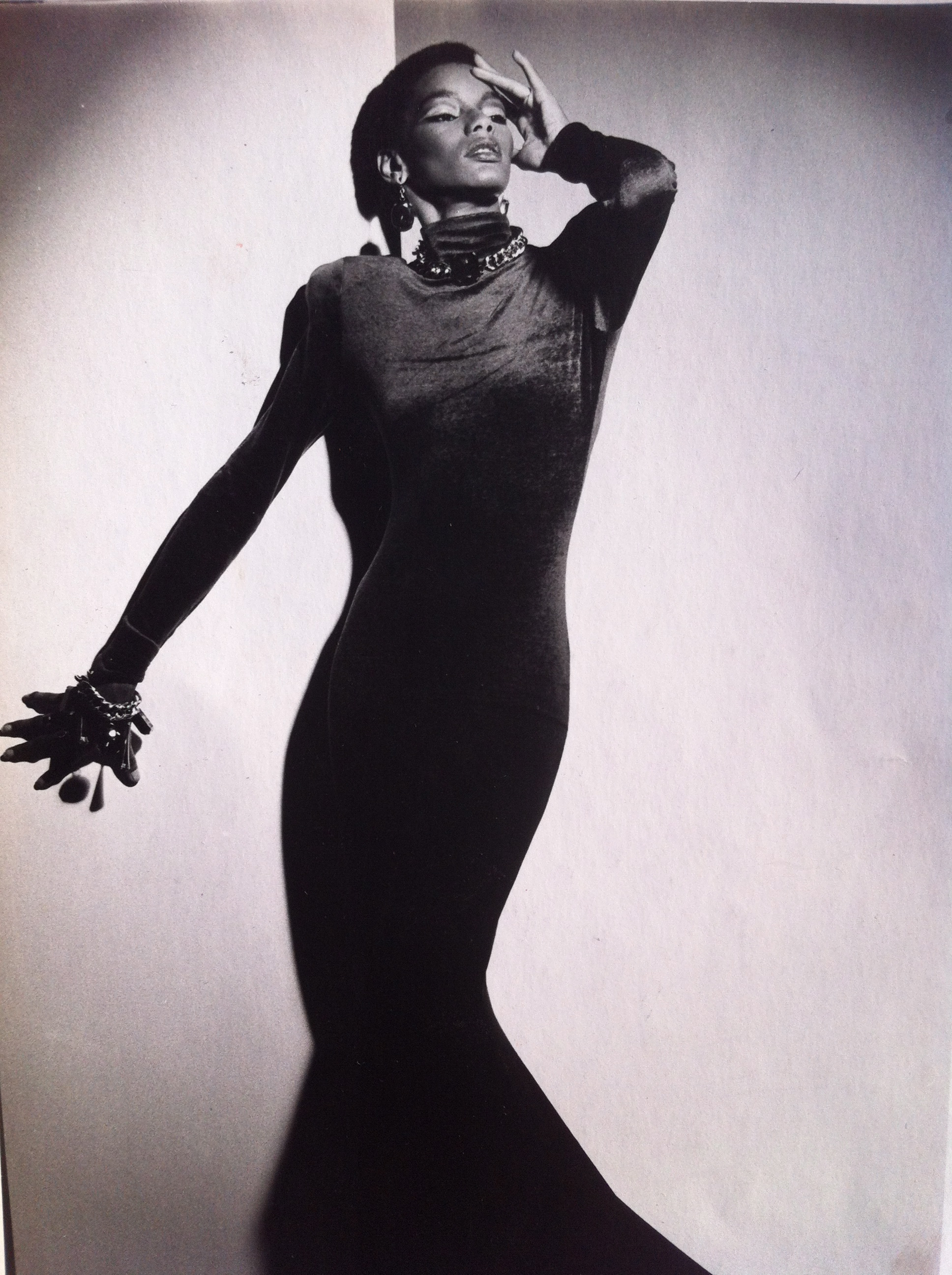
Modeling in Paris, early 80s

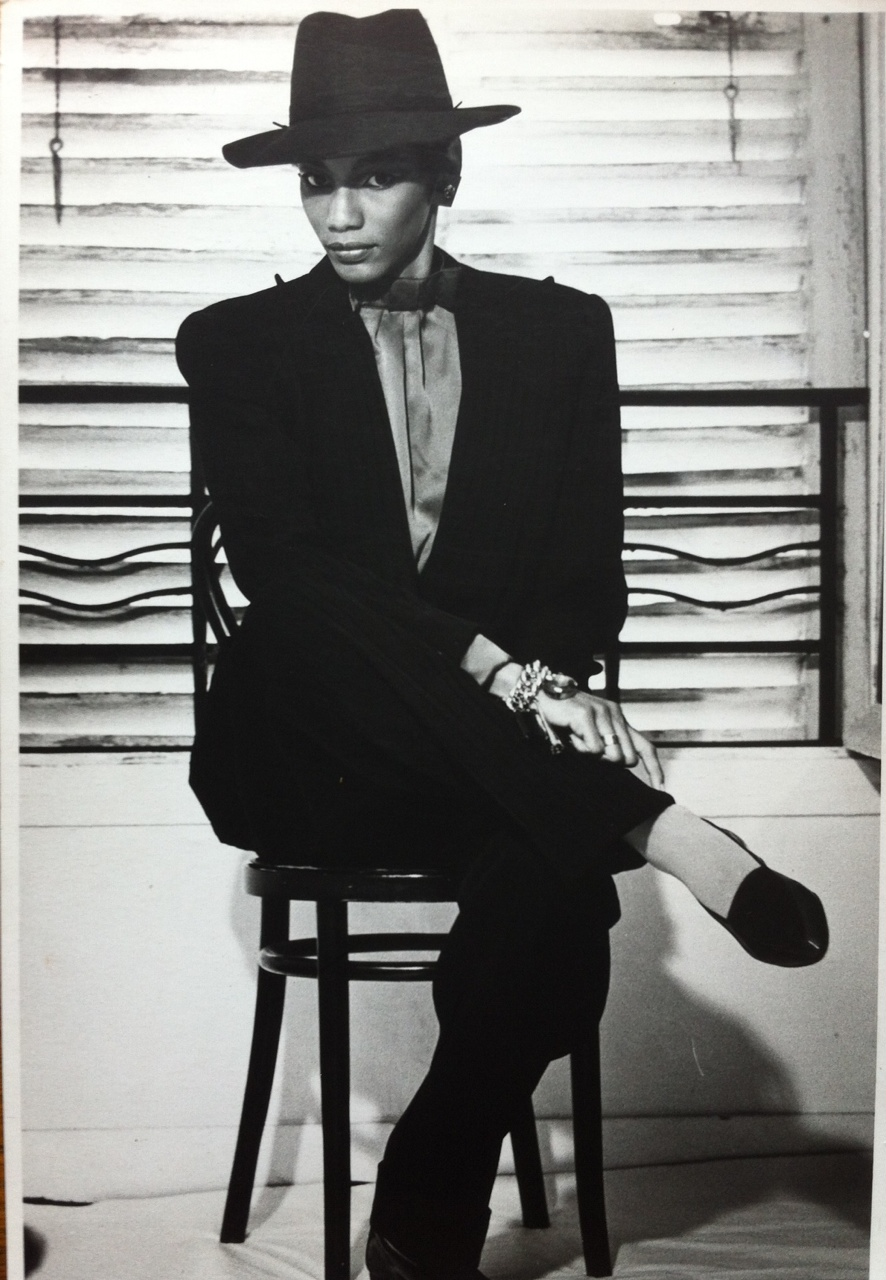
Wearing Thierry Mugler

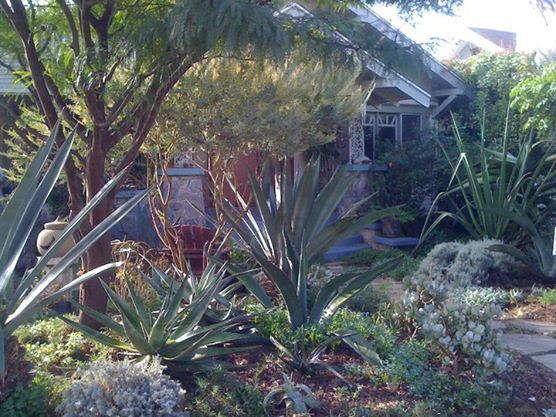
Landscape garden "28th Street"
