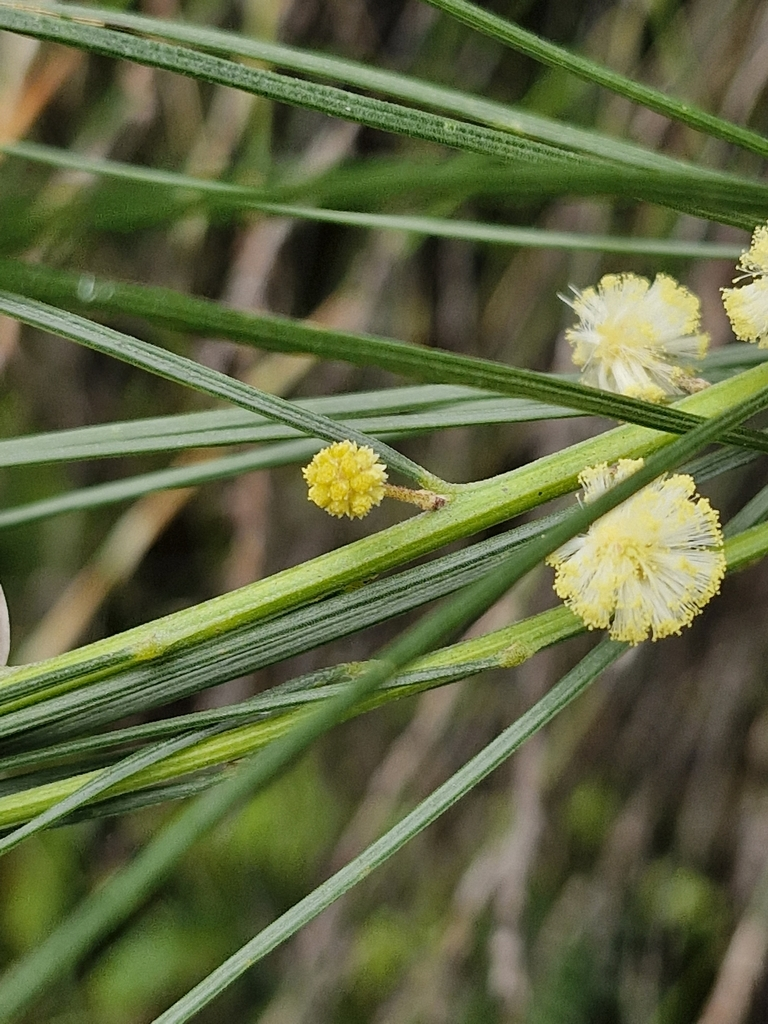
- Near Wentworth Falls

Scientific classification
- Kingdom: Plantae
- Clade: Embryophytes
- Clade: Tracheophytes
- Clade: Spermatophytes
- Clade: Angiosperms
- Clade: Eudicots
- Clade: Rosids
- Order: Fabales
- Family: Fabaceae
- Subfamily: Caesalpinioideae
- Clade: Mimosoid clade
- Genus: Acacia
- Species: A. ptychoclada

Binomial name
- Acacia ptychoclada Maiden & Blakely
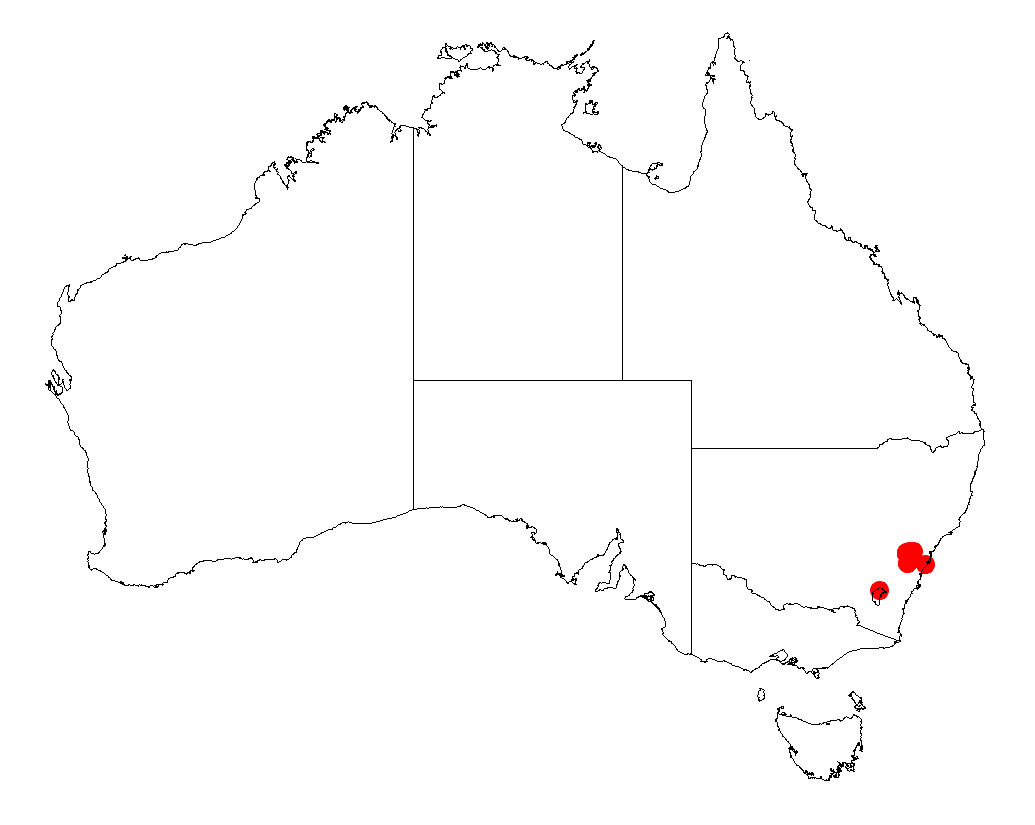
- Occurrence data from AVH

= Acacia ptychoclada =

Species of legume

Acacia ptychoclada is a shrub of the genus Acacia and the subgenus Plurinerves that is endemic to a small area of south eastern Australia.

== Description ==
The shrub typically grows to a height of 0.6 to 2 m (2 ft 0 in to 6 ft 7 in) and has a slender and erect habit with angular, strongly ribbed and hairy branchlets. Like most species of Acacia, it has phyllodes rather than true leaves. The ascending and evergreen phyllodes have a linear shape and are straight to slightly incurved with a length of 5 to 11 cm (2.0 to 4.3 in), a width of 0.6 to 1 mm (0.024 to 0.039 in) and have eight strongly raised main nerves. It blooms between January and April producing yellow flowers.

== Distribution ==
It has a limited distribution within the Blue Mountains of New South Wales from around Woodford in the south to around Mount Victoria in the north. It is often situated in swampy areas and damp places along creeks over or around areas of sandstone.

== See also ==
- List of Acacia species
