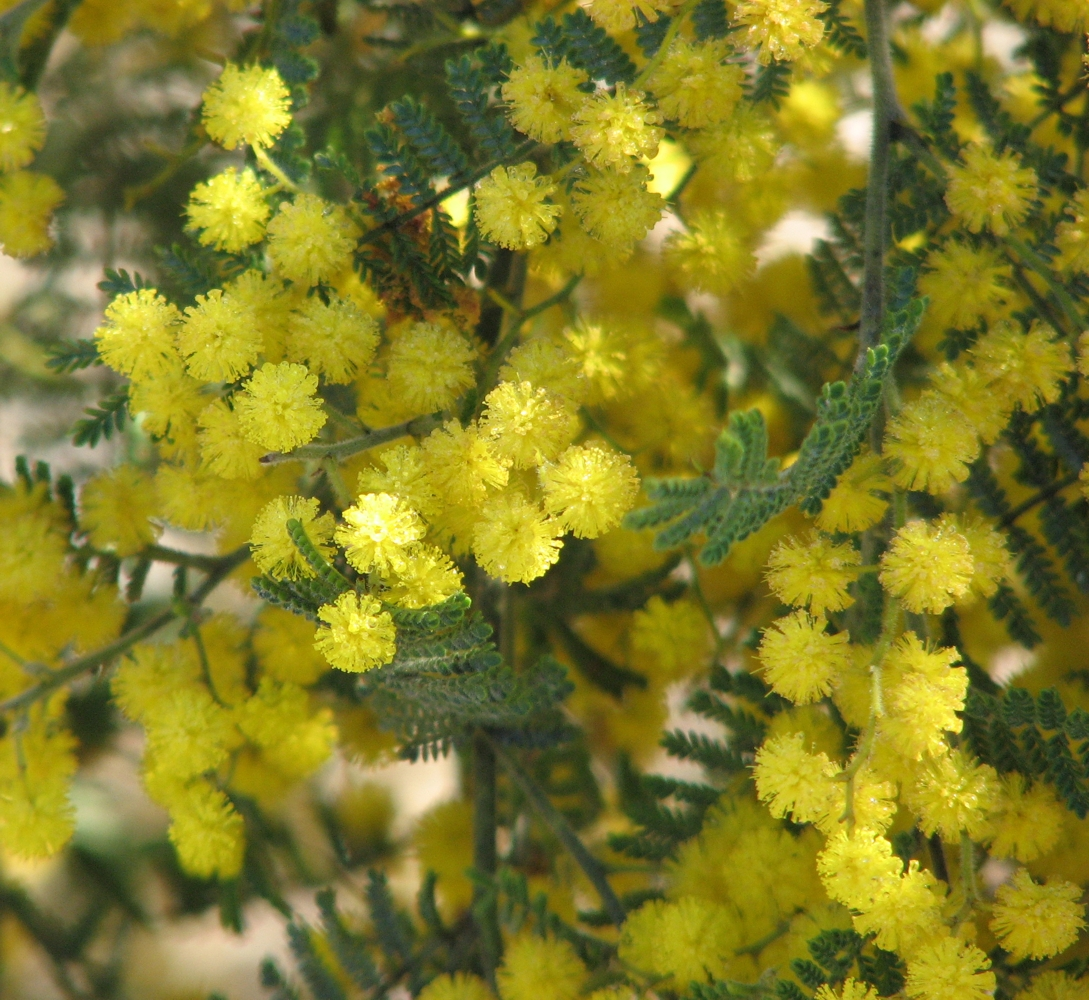

Scientific classification
- Kingdom: Plantae
- Clade: Tracheophytes
- Clade: Angiosperms
- Clade: Eudicots
- Clade: Rosids
- Order: Fabales
- Family: Fabaceae
- Subfamily: Caesalpinioideae
- Clade: Mimosoid clade
- Genus: Acacia
- Species: A. cardiophylla

Binomial name
- Acacia cardiophylla A.Cunn. ex Benth.
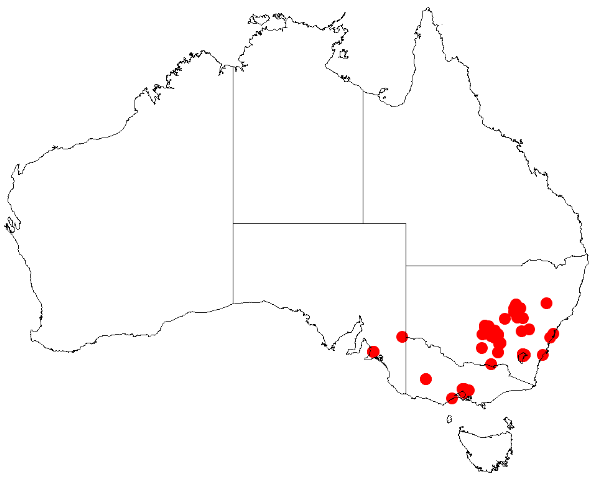
- Occurrence data from AVH

Synonyms
- Racosperma cardiophyllum (A.Cunn. ex Benth.) Pedley

= Acacia cardiophylla =

West Wyalong wattle

Species of legume

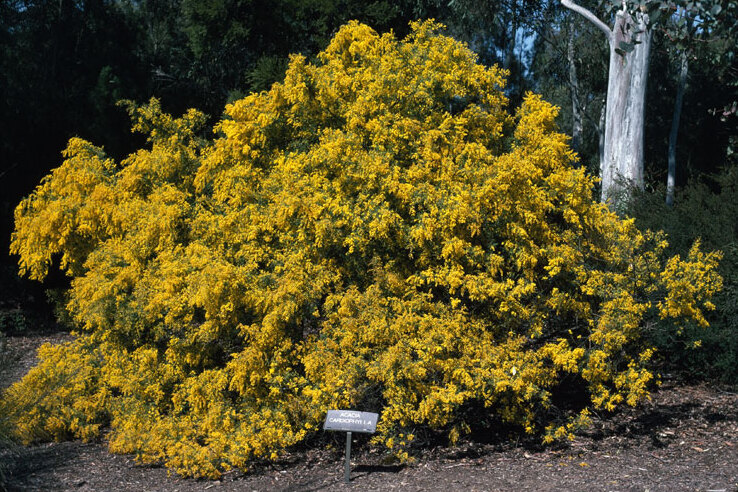
Habit in the Australian National Botanic Gardens

Acacia cardiophylla, commonly known as Wyalong wattle, West Wyalong wattle or heart-leaf wattle, is a species of flowering plant in the family Fabaceae and is endemic to New South Wales, Australia. It is a shrub or tree with smooth grey or mottled brown bark, slightly leathery bipinnate leaves, spherical heads of bright yellow flowers, and straight to slightly curved, thinly leathery pods covered with silvery hairs.

== Description ==
Acacia cardiophylla is an erect shrub to small tree that typically grows to a height of 1–3.5 m (3 ft 3 in – 11 ft 6 in), is often multi-stemmed and has smooth dark grey of mottled brown bark. The leaves are bipinnate with mostly 8 to 19 pairs of pinnae on a rachis 10–60 mm (0.39–2.36 in) long, the leaflets further divided with 4 to 12 pairs of narrowly egg-shaped to more or less circular pinnules. There are glands at the base of the lowest pinnae but otherwise absent. The flowers are borne in 6 to 21 spherical heads in axils in zig-zagged racemes 12–60 mm (0.47–2.36 in) long on a peduncle 1–3 mm (0.039–0.118 in) long. Each head is 3–5 mm (0.12–0.20 in) in diameter and contains 20 to 40 bright yellow flowers. Flowering occurs from August to November, and the pods are straight to slightly curved and more or less flat, 15–115 mm (0.59–4.53 in) long, 4–6.5 mm (0.16–0.26 in) wide, thinly leathery and covered with silvery hairs.

== Taxonomy ==
Acacia cardiophylla was first formally described in 1842 by George Bentham in Hooker's London Journal of Botany from an unpublished description by Allan Cunningham of specimens he collected in the "interior of N.S. Wales, north of the Macquarrie River". The specific epithet (cardiophylla) means 'heart-leaved'.

== Distribution and habitat ==
Acacia cardiophylla is indigenous to central and southern New South Wales and is found from Gilgandra in the north down to around Wagga Wagga in the south and extending to the Lake Cargelligo area in the west. It is found on stony hills and ridges in shallow rocky sandy soils in Eucalyptus woodland and mallee communities. It is naturalized in other parts of New South Wales, the Australian Capital Territory and the Adelaide Hills in South Australia.

== See also ==
- List of Acacia species
