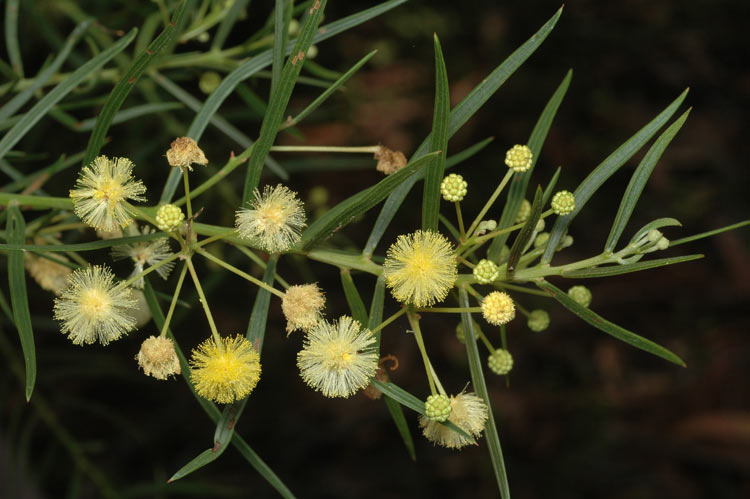
- In the Australian National Botanic Gardens

Scientific classification
- Kingdom: Plantae
- Clade: Embryophytes
- Clade: Tracheophytes
- Clade: Spermatophytes
- Clade: Angiosperms
- Clade: Eudicots
- Clade: Rosids
- Order: Fabales
- Family: Fabaceae
- Subfamily: Caesalpinioideae
- Clade: Mimosoid clade
- Genus: Acacia
- Species: A. trinervata

Binomial name
- Acacia trinervata Sieber ex DC.
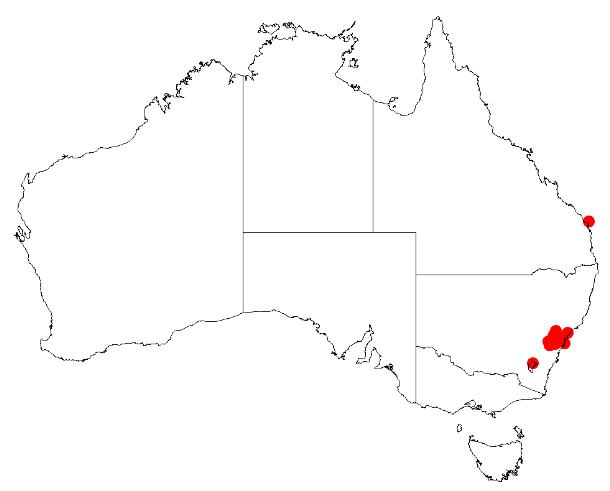

Synonyms
- Acacia cunninghamii Sweet; Acacia elongata var. angustifolia (Benth.) Maiden; Acacia trinervata var. angustifolia Benth. Acacia trinervata var. brevifolia Benth. Racosperma trinervatum (Sieber ex DC.) Pedley

= Acacia trinervata =

Three-veined wattle

Species of legume

Acacia trinervata commonly known as three-veined wattle, is a species of flowering plant in the family Fabaceae and the subgenus Phyllodineae. It is a tall shrub with angular branchlets, bright yellow flowers and grows in New South Wales.

== Description ==
Acacia trinervata is an erect or spreading shrub growing to a height of 1.5–3 m (4.9–9.8 ft). Its branchlets are smooth and angle towards the apex. The phyllodes are very narrowly elliptic to linear with a pointed sharp tip, 1.5–5 cm (0.59–1.97 in) long, 1–3 mm (0.039–0.118 in) wide and 2 or 3 prominent longitudinal veins. There is an inconspicuous gland 0–3 mm above the base, and the pulvinus is less than 1 mm long. The inflorescences are simple, occurring singly in the phyllode axils on peduncles about 10–20 mm long. The 20 to 30 bright yellow flowers are 5 to 7.5 mm in diameter. Flowering occurs from March to June and the fruit is a papery to thinly leathery pod, slightly swollen above the seed, minutely hairy, 6–12 cm (2.4–4.7 in) long and 1–3 mm (0.039–0.118 in) wide.

== Distribution ==
Three-veined wattle grows in open forest on sandstone and shale and is endemic to New South Wales and restricted to western Sydney and the lower Blue Mountains.

== Taxonomy and naming ==
The species was first described in 1825 by Franz Sieber, and the specific epithet trinervata derives from the Latin for "three veined".
