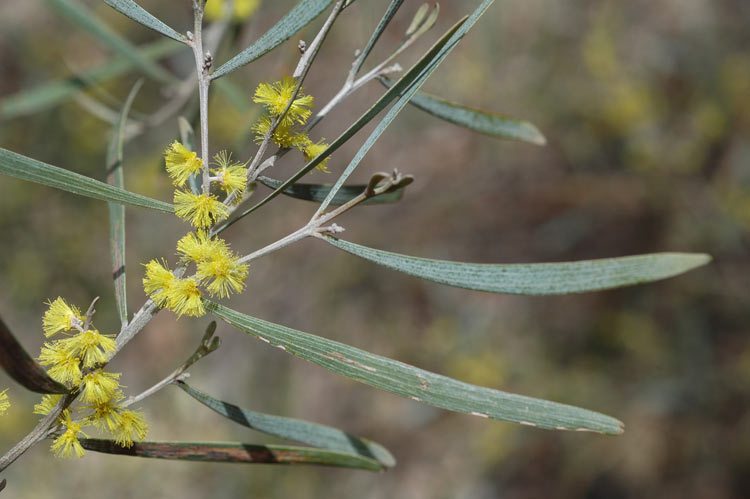
- In the Australian National Botanic Gardens

Scientific classification
- Kingdom: Plantae
- Clade: Tracheophytes
- Clade: Angiosperms
- Clade: Eudicots
- Clade: Rosids
- Order: Fabales
- Family: Fabaceae
- Subfamily: Caesalpinioideae
- Clade: Mimosoid clade
- Genus: Acacia
- Species: A. dawsonii

Binomial name
- Acacia dawsonii R.T.Baker
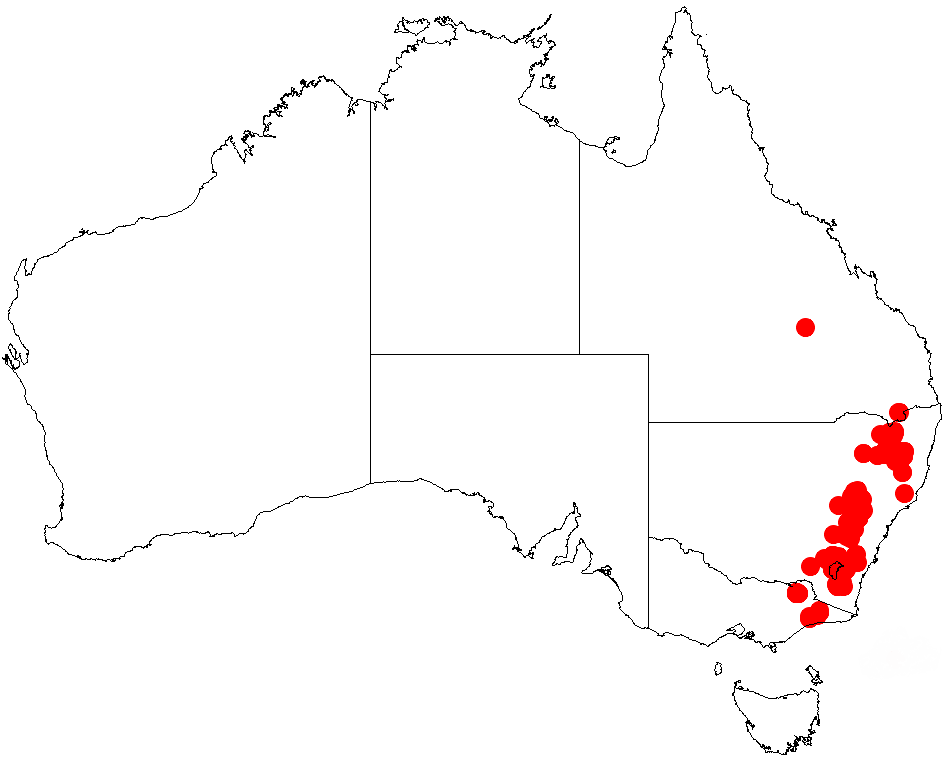
- Occurrence data from AVH

Synonyms
- Acacia dawsoni R.T.Baker orth. var.; Racosperma dawsonii (R.T.Baker) Pedley

= Acacia dawsonii =

Dawson's wattle

Species of legume

Acacia dawsonii commonly known as poverty wattle, Dawson's wattle, or mitta wattle, is a species of flowering plant in the family Fabaceae and is endemic to south-eastern, continental Australia. It is an erect or spreading shrub with very narrowly elliptic to linear phyllodes, spherical heads of light golden yellow flowers and linear, thinly leathery pods.

== Description ==
Acacia dawsonii is an erect or spreading shrub that typically grows to a height of 0.5 to 4 metres (2 to 13 ft), with branchlets that are hairy between resinous ridges. The evergreen phyllodes are straight to slightly curved, very narrowly elliptic to linear and 40–110 mm (1.6–4.3 in) long and 2–5 mm (0.079–0.197 in) with up to ten longitudinal veins of which one or two are usually more prominent that the others. The flowers are borne in racemes in spherical heads in leaf axils on a peduncle 1–3 mm (0.039–0.118 in) long. Each head is 3–4 mm (0.12–0.16 in) in diameter with usually 4 to 8 light golden yellow flowers. Flowering occurs from September to October, and the fruit is a linear pod up to 60 mm (2.4 in) long, 2–5 mm (0.079–0.197 in) wide, straight or with a slight curve and thinly leathery to firmly papery and smooth.

== Taxonomy and naming ==
Acacia dawsonii was first formally described in 1897 by Richard Baker and the description was published in Proceedings of the Linnean Society of New South Wales from specimens collected near Rylstone. The specific epithet (dawsonii) is named in honour of Mr. J Dawson, L.S., who first pointed the plant out to Baker.

== Distribution and habitat ==
Poverty wattle grows in grassland and eucalypt woodland in rocky, clay or sandy soils to an area down the east coast from as far north as Stanthorpe in south east Queensland, through the slopes and tablelands of New South Wales and the Australian Capital Territory, to Mitta Mitta in north east Victoria.

== Use in horticulture ==
This species is not widely cultivated but is quite hardy and suitable for a wide range of climates.

== See also ==
- List of Acacia species
