= Edward Edgar Pescott =

Edward Edgar Pescott (11 December 1872 – 31 July 1954) was an Australian naturalist. He was Principal Governor of the Burnley School of Horticulture from 1909 to 1916, and Government Pomologist for the Victorian Department of Agriculture from 1917 to 1937. He was a fellow of the Linnean Society of London.

In the early 1920s, Pescott became widely known through weekly radio broadcasts.

== Books ==
- Native Flowers of Victoria, 1914,
- The Dahlia in Australia, 1920,
- Bulb Growing in Australia, 1926,
- Gardening in Australia, 1926,
- Rose Growing in Australia, 1928,
- Wild Flowers of Australia, 1929,
- New Way Gardening, 1933
