= Chinese indigo =

Chinese indigo may refer to:

- Isatis indigotica, a kind of woad
- Indigofera amblyantha, a kind of indigo plant, in the family Fabaceae
- Indigofera decora, a kind of indigo plant, also known as summer wisteria
- Persicaria tinctoria, a species of flowering plant in the buckwheat family
- Indigo naturalis

== See also ==
- Indigo dye
- Han purple and Han blue, pigments developed in ancient China
- Indirubin, a chemical component of indigo used in traditional Chinese medicine
- INDIGO, Beijing, a mixed-use development in Beijing, China
- Lactarius indigo, an edible mushroom sold in China, Guatemala, and Mexico
- Realgar/Indigo naturalis, a medication used in China to treat leukemia
- Indigo naturalis
