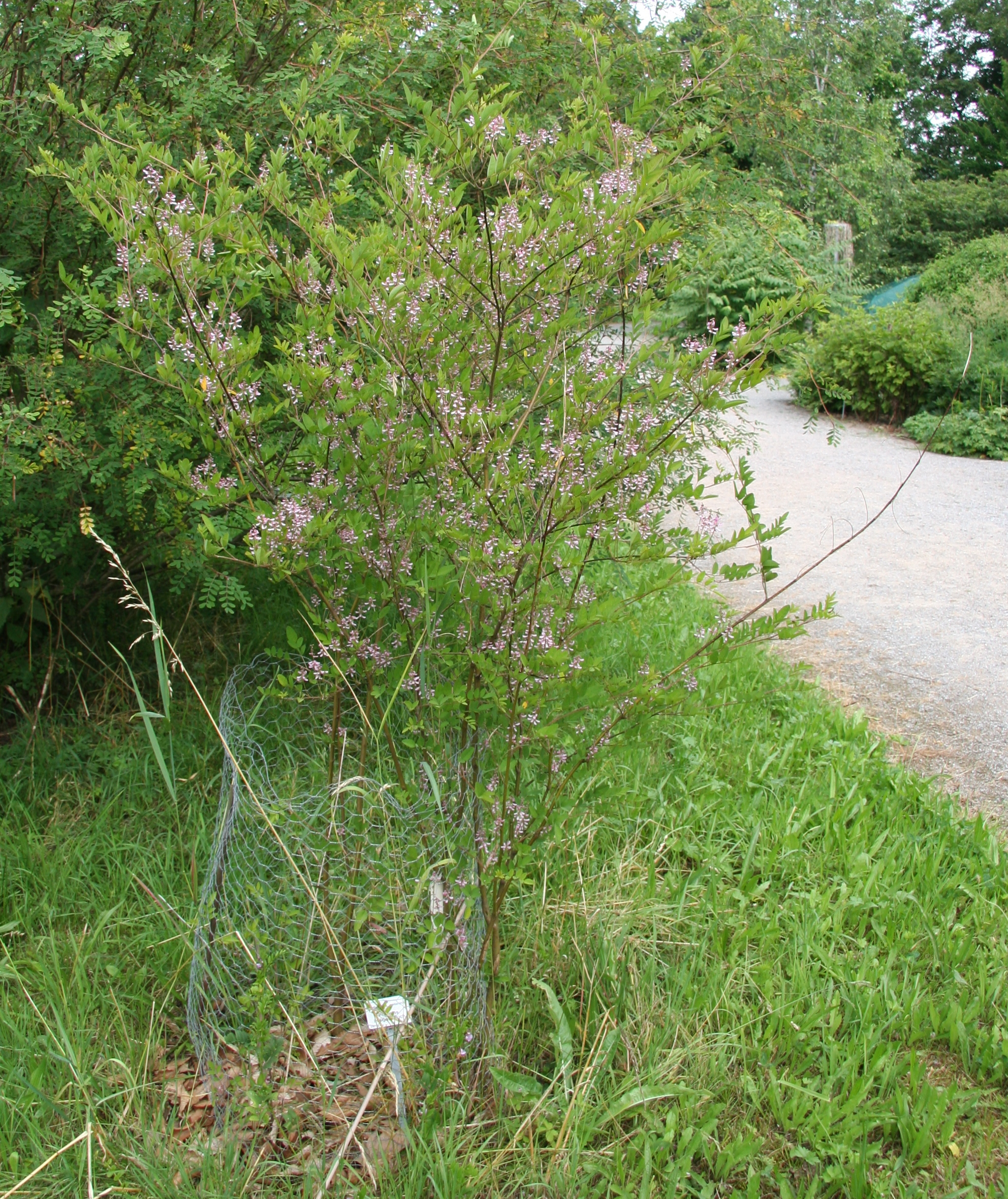
- At the Dresden Botanical Garden
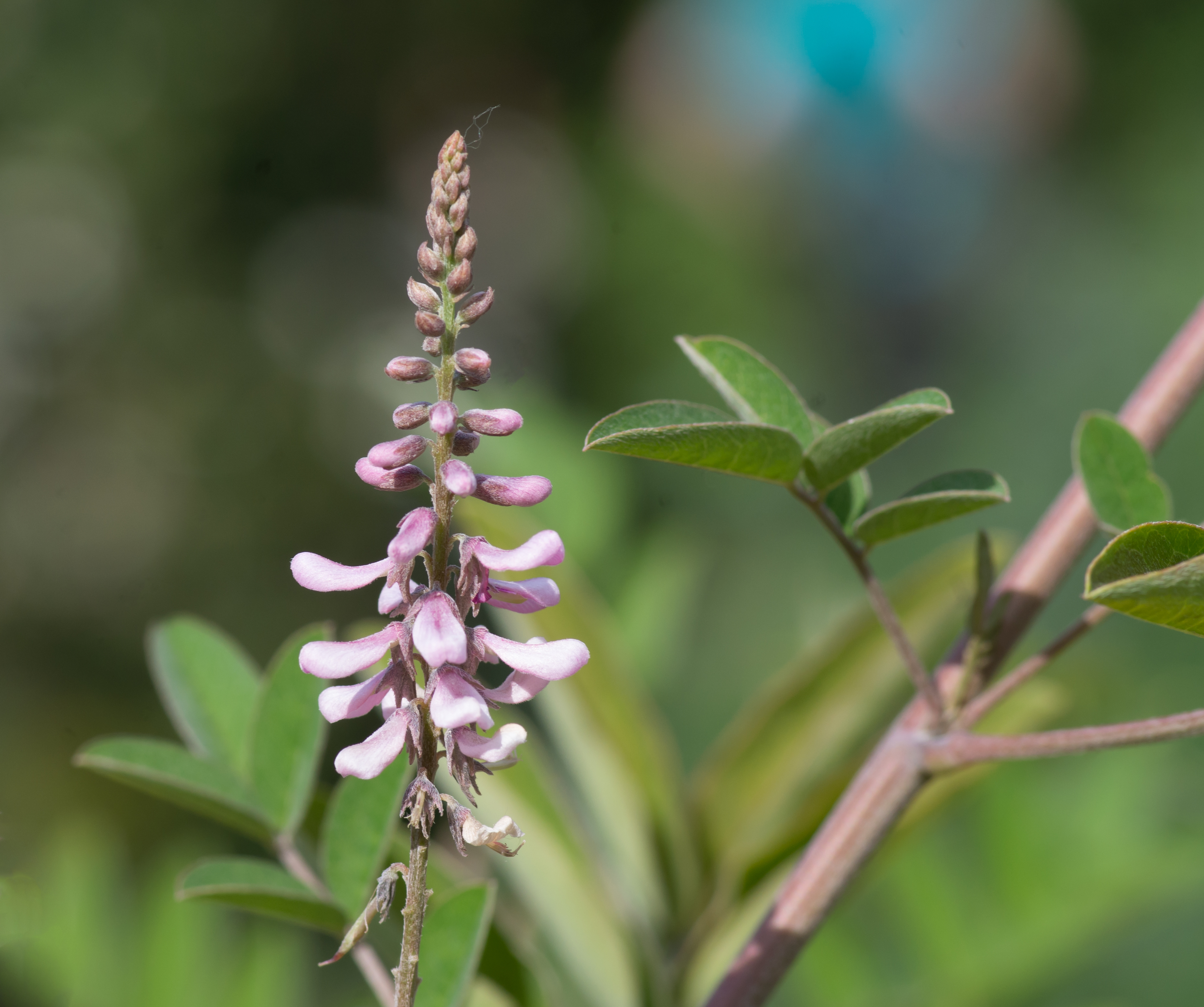
- Close-up of inflorescence, leaves

Scientific classification
- Kingdom: Plantae
- Clade: Tracheophytes
- Clade: Angiosperms
- Clade: Eudicots
- Clade: Rosids
- Order: Fabales
- Family: Fabaceae
- Subfamily: Faboideae
- Genus: Indigofera
- Species: I. szechuensis

Binomial name
- Indigofera szechuensis Craib

Synonyms
- Indigofera potaninii Craib

= Indigofera szechuensis =

Species of plant in the legume family

Indigofera szechuensis (syn. Indigofera potaninii) is a species of flowering plant in the family Fabaceae, native to Tibet and central China. It is typically found growing on slopes, along trails, and on streambanks at 2,500–3,800 m (8,200–12,500 ft) above sea level. It is a non-climbing shrub reaching 2.5 m (8 ft).

It is the namesake of a species complex that also includes Indigofera calcicola, I. delavayi, I. franchetii, I. hancockii, I. lenticellata, I. pendula, and I. rigioclada. Most of what is cultivated in the United Kingdom as Indigofera potaninii is actually Indigofera howellii.
