= Megachile parksi =

Conservation status
- Imperiled (NatureServe)

Scientific classification
- Kingdom: Animalia
- Phylum: Arthropoda
- Class: Insecta
- Order: Hymenoptera
- Family: Megachilidae
- Genus: Megachile
- Species: M. parksi

Binomial name
- Megachile parksi Mitchell, 1936

Species of leafcutter bee (Megachile)

Megachile parksi is a species of solitary bee in the family Megachilidae commonly called leafcutter bees. It is known from small areas in the states of Texas and Oklahoma, United States. It is considered Possibly Extinct by NatureServe as of 2019, but was rediscovered in 2022.

== Distribution and Ecology ==
After its description in 1936, Megachile parksi has only been observed five other times in Texas. It was rediscovered in 2022 in Oklahoma at the Little Sahara State Park. It has been observed to visit Indigofera miniata, Tephrosia virginiana, and Gaillardia. It may be a habitat specialist on mobile sand dunes which may explain its rarity.
