= Indigofera cloiselii =

Conservation status
- Least Concern (IUCN 2.3)

Scientific classification
- Kingdom: Plantae
- Clade: Tracheophytes
- Clade: Angiosperms
- Clade: Eudicots
- Clade: Rosids
- Order: Fabales
- Family: Fabaceae
- Subfamily: Faboideae
- Genus: Indigofera
- Species: I. cloiselii

Binomial name
- Indigofera cloiselii Drake

Synonyms
- Vaughania cloiselii (Drake) Du Puy, Labat & Schrire

Species of legume

Indigofera cloiselii, synonym Vaughania cloiselii, is a species of legume in the family Fabaceae. It is endemic to Madagascar.
