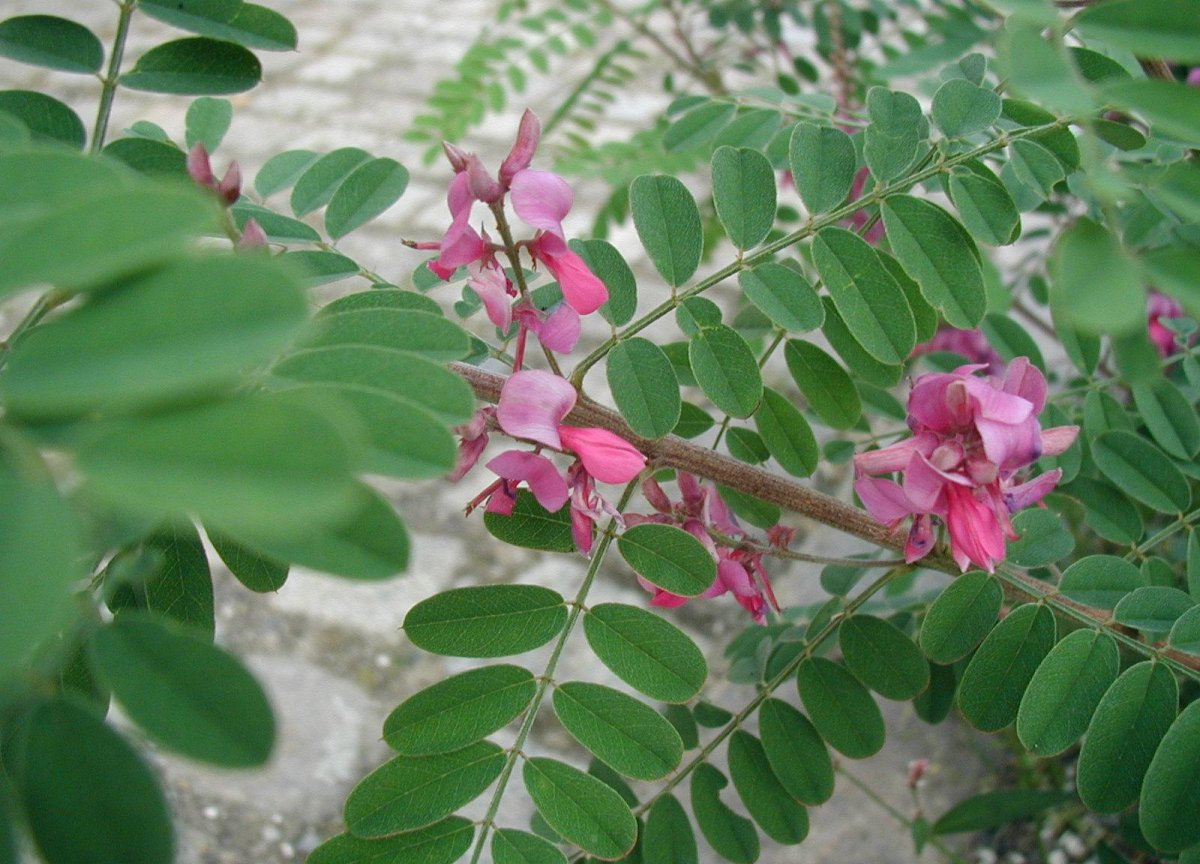

Scientific classification
- Kingdom: Plantae
- Clade: Tracheophytes
- Clade: Angiosperms
- Clade: Eudicots
- Clade: Rosids
- Order: Fabales
- Family: Fabaceae
- Subfamily: Faboideae
- Genus: Indigofera
- Species: I. heterantha

Binomial name
- Indigofera heterantha Wall.

= Indigofera heterantha =

Species of flowering plant in the legume family

Indigofera heterantha (syn. Indigofera gerardiana), commonly known as Himalayan indigo, is a species of flowering plant in the legume family Fabaceae. It is native to the northwestern Himalayas of Tibet, in Asia.

It belongs to the same genus as plants used to produce indigo dye.

== Description ==
Indigofera heterantha is a deciduous shrub growing to 2–3 m (7–10 ft) tall and broad, with pinnate leaves, each leaf carrying up to 21 grey-green oval leaflets, and racemes of purple pea-like flowers in summer.

The Latin specific epithet heterantha means "with various or diverse flowers".

== Cultivation ==
Indigofera heterantha is cultivated as an ornamental plant for a position in bright sunlight. It is drought tolerant and very hardy, down to −15 °C (5 °F) However, in colder areas it can be herbaceous, meaning that at the end of the season it dies back down to ground level before regrowing the following year.

This plant has gained the Royal Horticultural Society's Award of Garden Merit.
