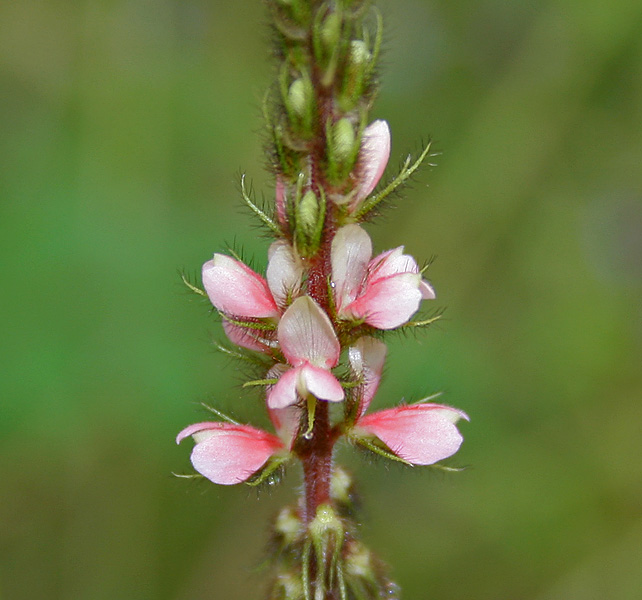

Scientific classification
- Kingdom: Plantae
- Clade: Tracheophytes
- Clade: Angiosperms
- Clade: Eudicots
- Clade: Rosids
- Order: Fabales
- Family: Fabaceae
- Subfamily: Faboideae
- Genus: Indigofera
- Species: I. astragalina

Binomial name
- Indigofera astragalina DC.

= Indigofera astragalina =

Species of plant

Indogofera astragalina, a legume also known as silky indigo, is a herb found in India, tropical Africa, Madagascar, New Guinea and Australia. It commonly grows in sandy or rocky soils in dry deciduous forests or along roadsides and lake margins. It is also cultivated.
