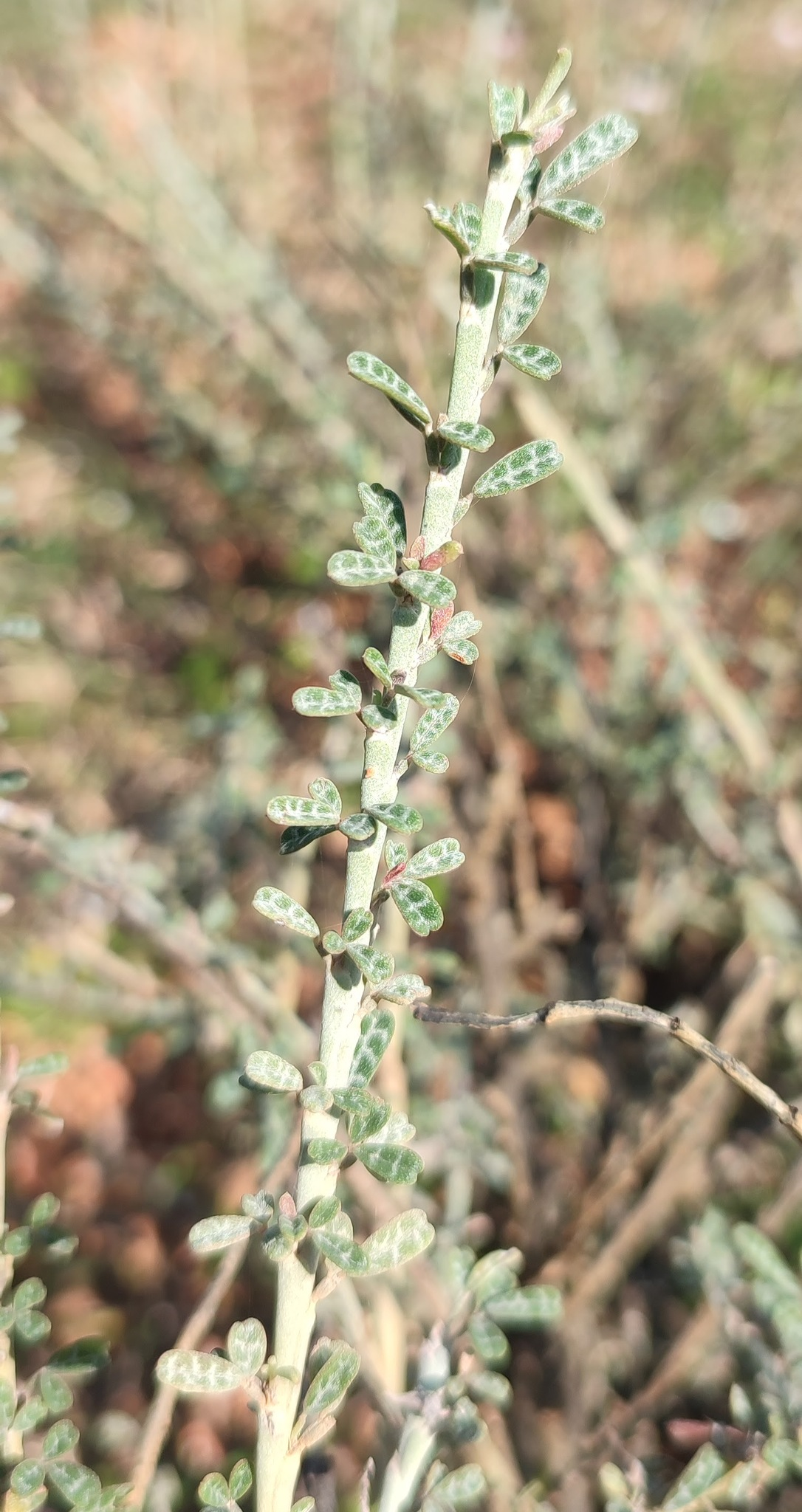

Conservation status
- Least Concern (IUCN 3.1)

Scientific classification
- Kingdom: Plantae
- Clade: Tracheophytes
- Clade: Angiosperms
- Clade: Eudicots
- Clade: Rosids
- Order: Fabales
- Family: Fabaceae
- Subfamily: Faboideae
- Genus: Indigofera
- Species: I. marmorata

Binomial name
- Indigofera marmorata Balf.f.

= Indigofera marmorata =

Species of plant

Indigofera marmorata is a species of legume in the family Fabaceae. It is endemic to north-central Socotra in Yemen. Its natural habitats are subtropical or tropical dry forests and subtropical or tropical dry shrubland.
