= Indigofera nephrocarpoides =

Conservation status
- Least Concern (IUCN 3.1)

Scientific classification
- Kingdom: Plantae
- Clade: Tracheophytes
- Clade: Angiosperms
- Clade: Eudicots
- Clade: Rosids
- Order: Fabales
- Family: Fabaceae
- Subfamily: Faboideae
- Genus: Indigofera
- Species: I. nephrocarpoides

Binomial name
- Indigofera nephrocarpoides J.B.Gillett

Species of legume

Indigofera nephrocarpoides is a species of plant in the family Fabaceae. It is native to the islands of Socotra and Samhah in the Socotra Archipelago of Yemen. Its natural habitat is subtropical or tropical dry forests.
