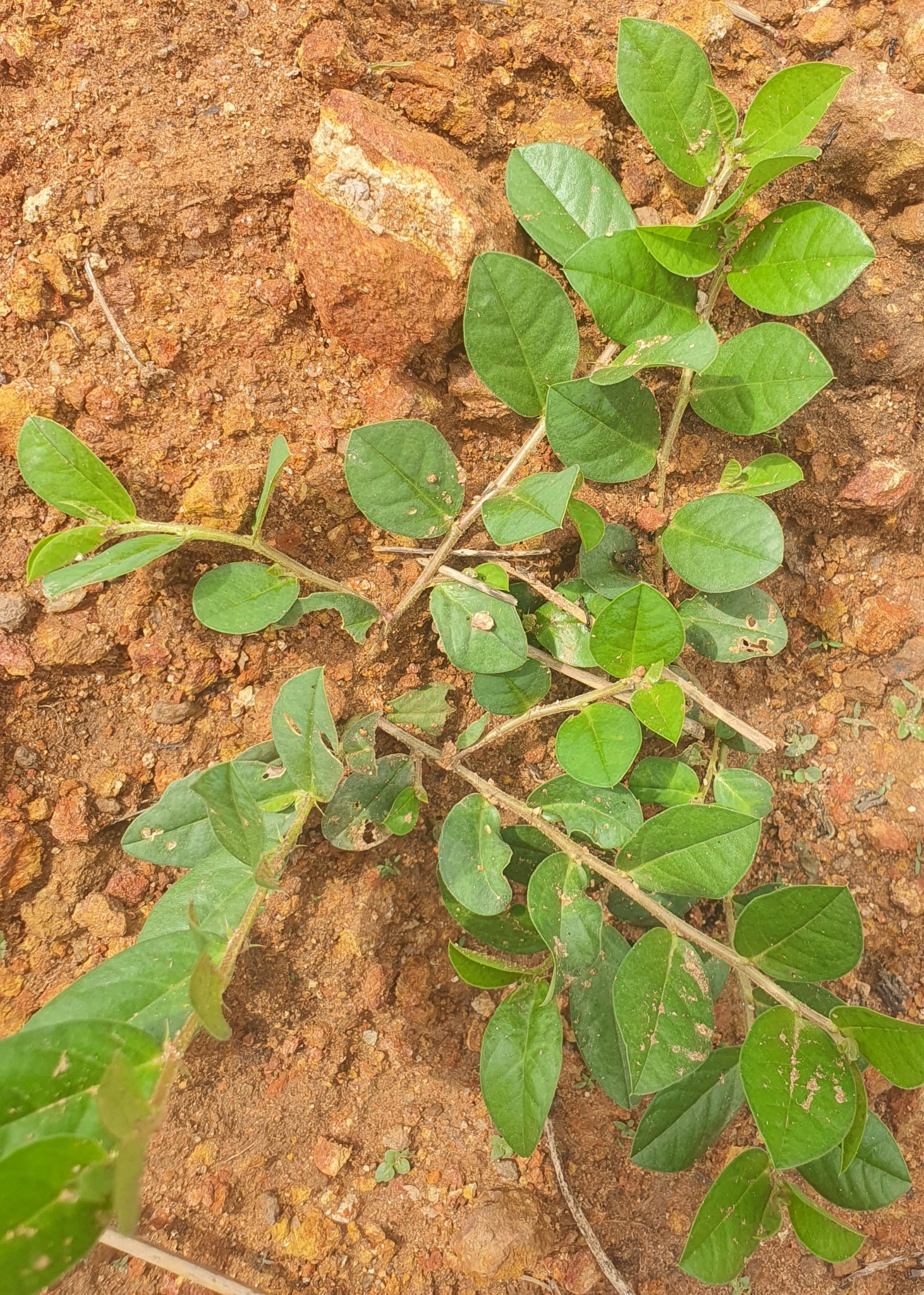

Scientific classification
- Kingdom: Plantae
- Clade: Tracheophytes
- Clade: Angiosperms
- Clade: Eudicots
- Clade: Rosids
- Order: Fabales
- Family: Fabaceae
- Subfamily: Faboideae
- Genus: Indigofera
- Species: I. nummulariifolia

Binomial name
- Indigofera nummulariifolia (L.) Livera ex Alston

= Indigofera nummulariifolia =

Species of plant

Indigofera nummulariifolia is a species of flowering plant from the genus Indigofera.
