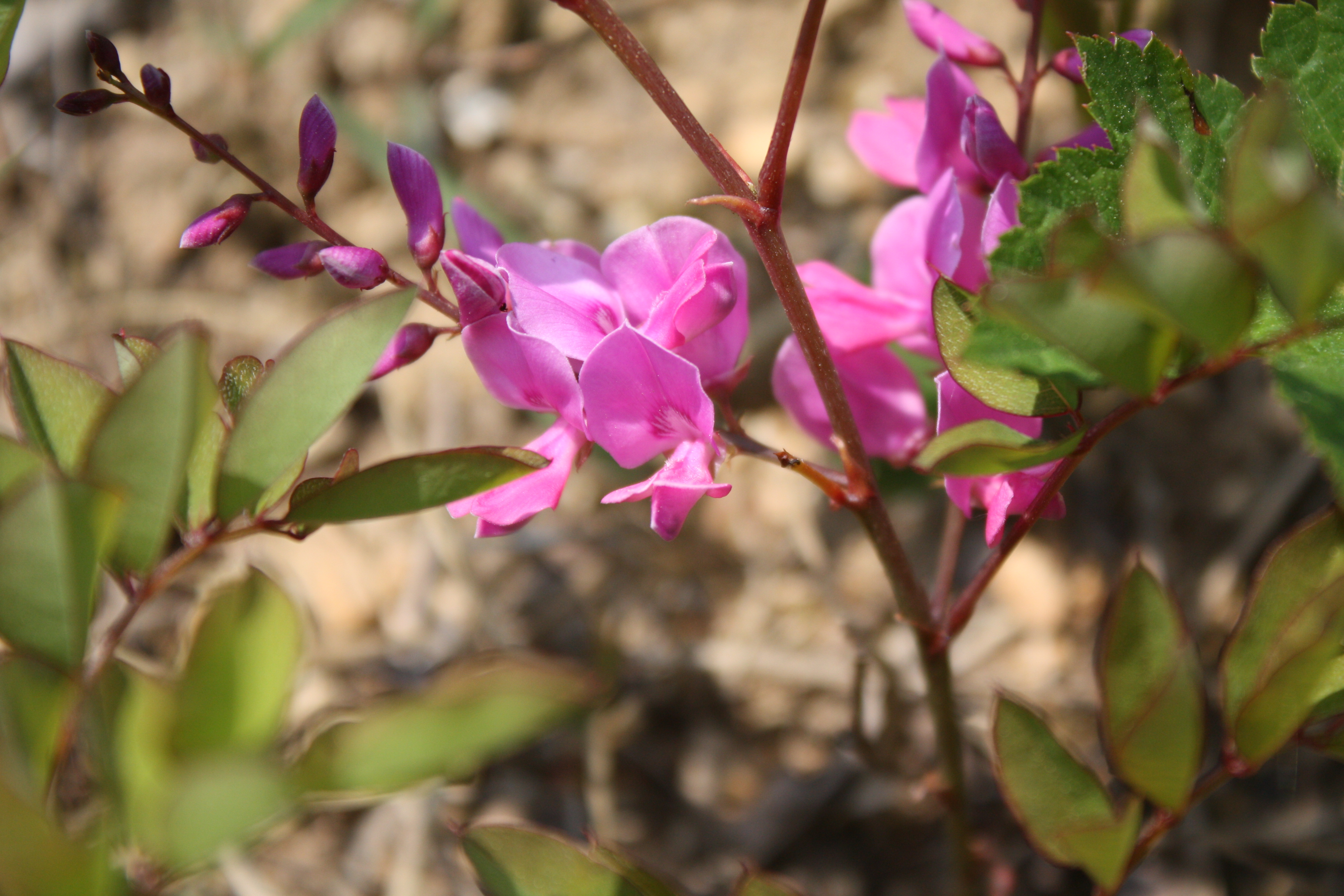
- Inflorescences
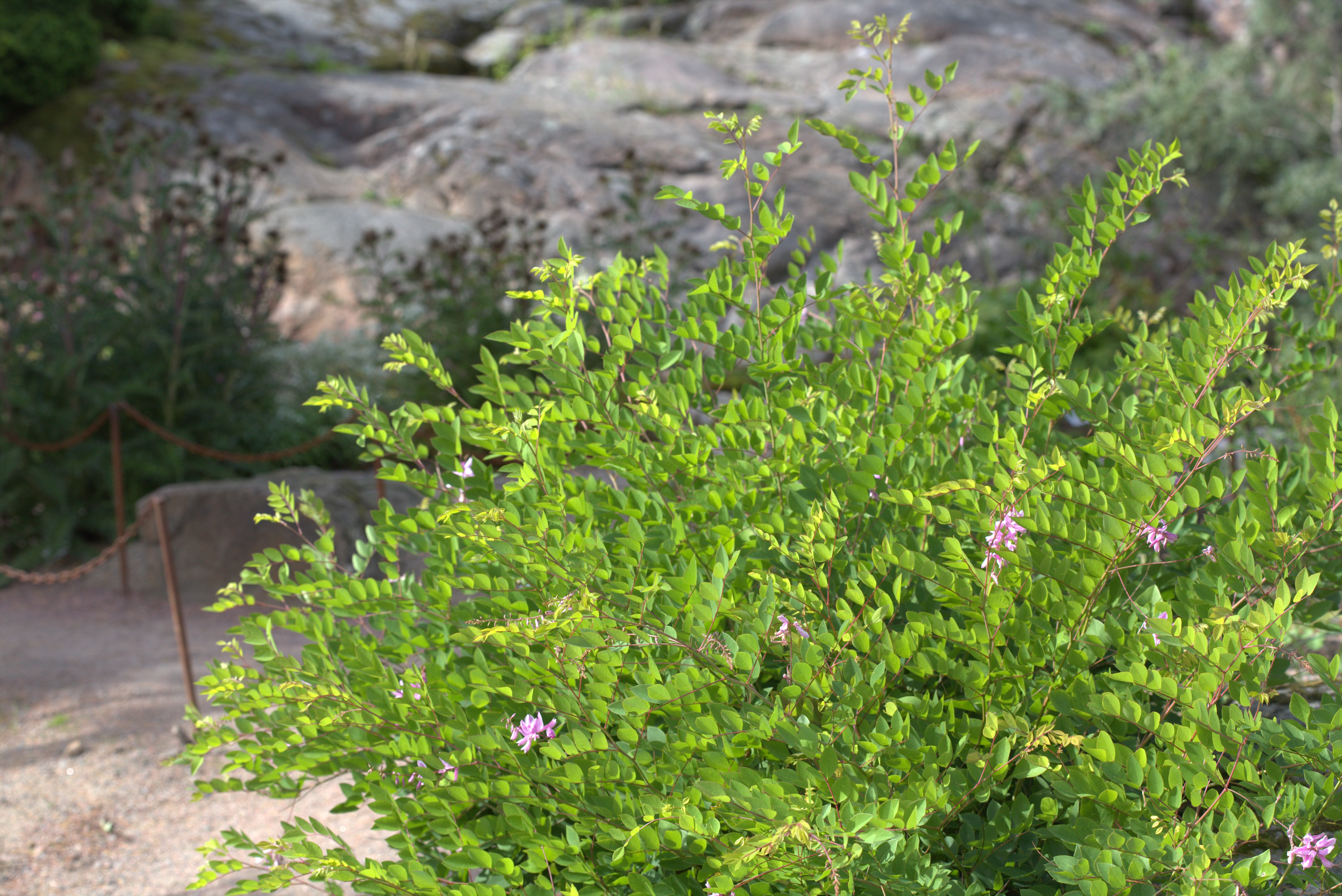
- At Gothenburg Botanical Garden

Scientific classification
- Kingdom: Plantae
- Clade: Tracheophytes
- Clade: Angiosperms
- Clade: Eudicots
- Clade: Rosids
- Order: Fabales
- Family: Fabaceae
- Subfamily: Faboideae
- Genus: Indigofera
- Species: I. kirilowii

Binomial name
- Indigofera kirilowii Maxim. ex Palibin

Synonyms
- Indigofera kirilowii var. alba Q.Z.Han; Indigofera kirilowii var. coreana Craib; Indigofera kirilowii f. coreana (Craib) M.Kim

= Indigofera kirilowii =

Species of plant in the legume family

Indigofera kirilowii is a species of flowering plant in the family Fabaceae, native to eastern, central and northern China, the Korean Peninsula, and Kyushu island of Japan. A deciduous, suckering shrub typically 75 cm (30 in) tall, it is hardy in USDA zones 5 through 7. The unimproved species and a white‑flowered "alba" selection are commercially available.

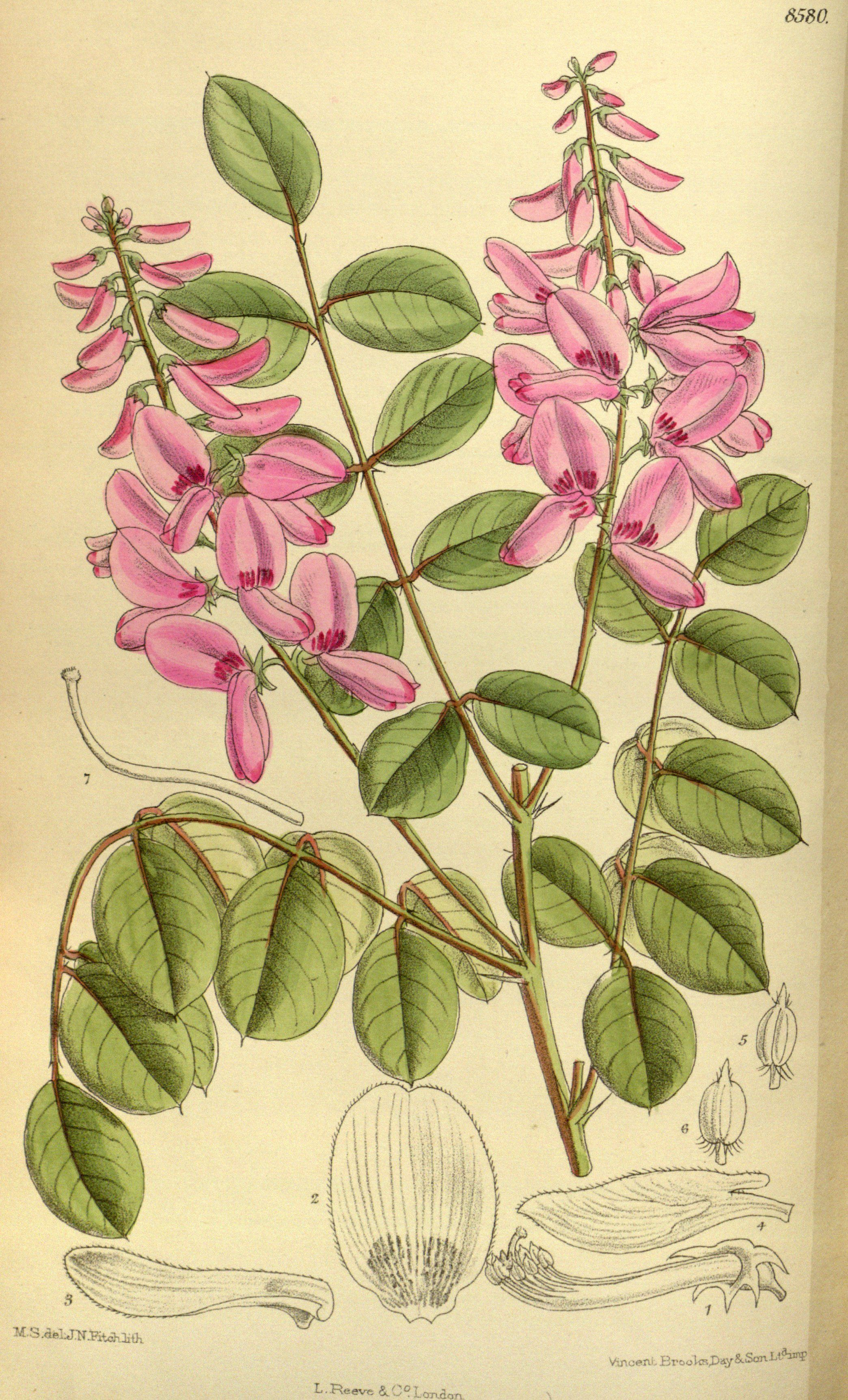
Botanical illustration

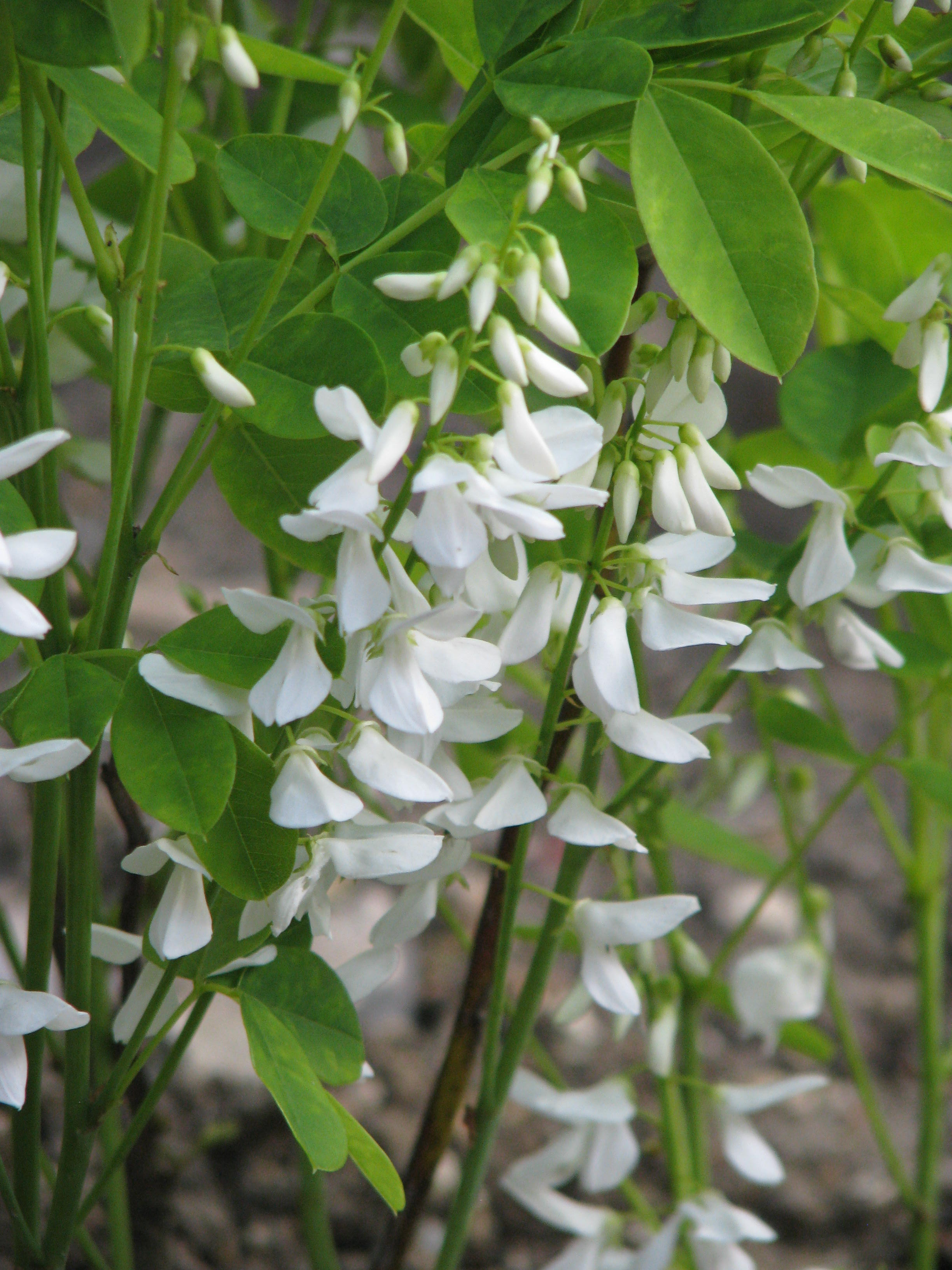
"alba" form

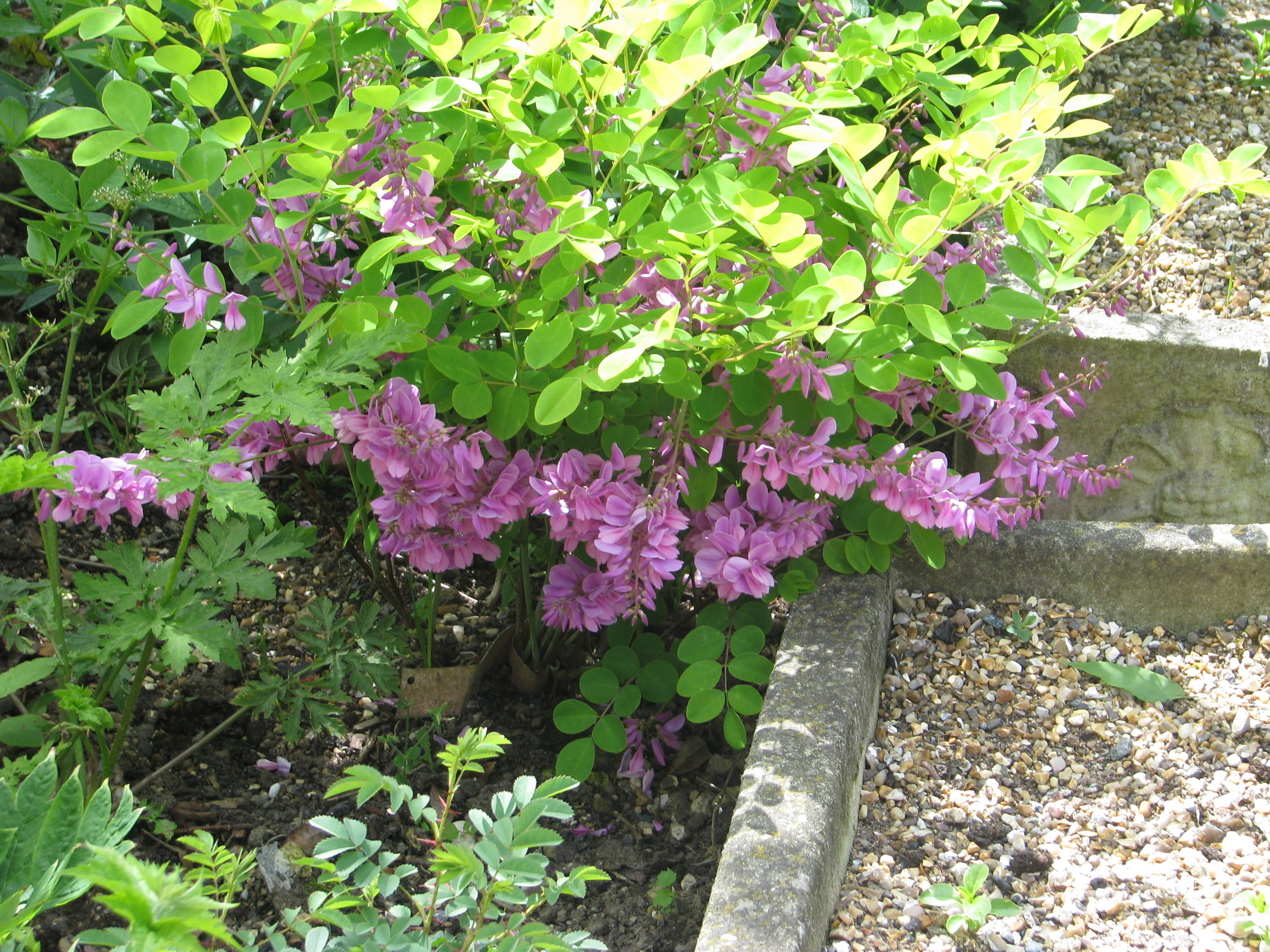
In a garden setting

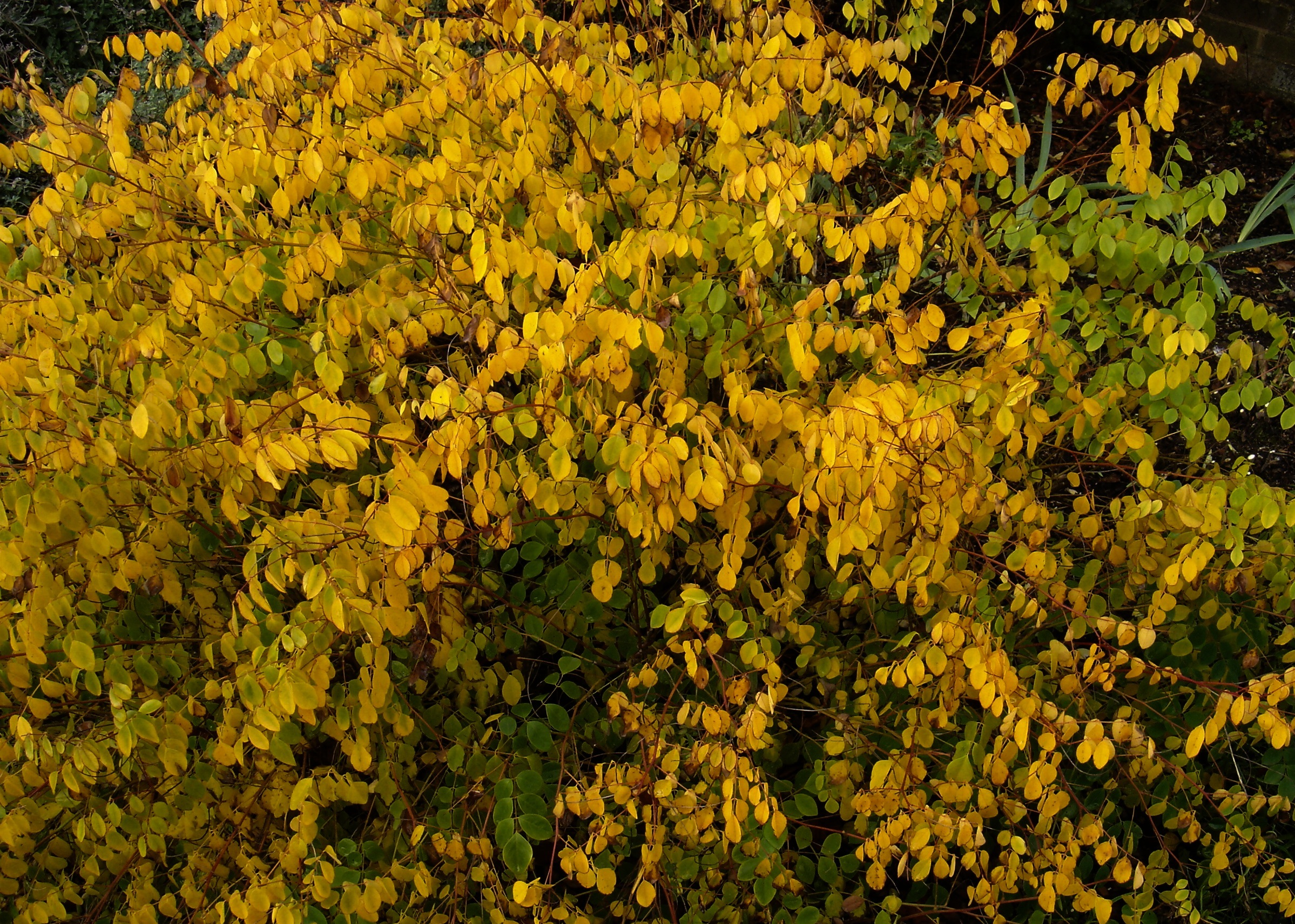
Fall foliage
