= Indigofera glaucescens =

Scientific classification
- Kingdom: Plantae
- Clade: Tracheophytes
- Clade: Angiosperms
- Clade: Eudicots
- Clade: Rosids
- Order: Fabales
- Family: Fabaceae
- Subfamily: Faboideae
- Genus: Indigofera
- Species: I. glaucescens

Binomial name
- Indigofera glaucescens Eckl. & Zeyh.

Synonyms
- Indigofera reflexa E.Mey.

Species of flowering plant

Indigofera glaucescens is a species of flowering plant in the family Fabaceae, native to the Cape Provinces of South Africa. It is consumed by common warthogs (Phacochoerus africanus).
