= Indigofera basedowii =

Showy indigo

Scientific classification
- Kingdom: Plantae
- Clade: Tracheophytes
- Clade: Angiosperms
- Clade: Eudicots
- Clade: Rosids
- Order: Fabales
- Family: Fabaceae
- Subfamily: Faboideae
- Genus: Indigofera
- Species: I. basedowii

Binomial name
- Indigofera basedowii E.Pritz.
- Occurrence data from AVH

Synonyms
- Indigofera basedowii E.Pritz. subsp. basedowii

Species of plant

Indigofera basedowii commonly known as showy indigo, is a species of flowering plant in the family Fabaceae. It is a small spreading shrub with grey green stems, deep pink-purple flowers and is endemic to Central Australia.

== Description ==
Indigofera basedowii is an upright spreading shrub 0.3–1 m (1 ft 0 in – 3 ft 3 in) high, with angled, grey-green and softly hairy new stems. The leaves are divided with 7-11 grey-green or green, elliptic to egg-shaped leaflets on a petiole 4–12 mm (0.16–0.47 in) long. The flowers are arranged in groups 55–145 mm (2.2–5.7 in) long, and longer than the leaves, each flower on a pedicel 0.2–1.5 mm (0.0079–0.0591 in) long, the calyx 2.3–4.2 mm (0.091–0.165 in) long, and covered in grey to nearly black hairs. The standard petal is egg-shaped to round, 5.5–7.2 mm (0.22–0.28 in) long, the wings 5.5–7 mm (0.22–0.28 in) long and spoon-shaped, and the keel 5.2–6.5 mm (0.20–0.26 in) long. Flowering mainly occurs from June to September and the fruit is terete, 15–42 mm (0.59–1.65 in) long with dense, spreading hairs, and 5 to 10 seeds.

== Taxonomy ==
Indigofera basedowii was first formally described in 1918 by Ernst Georg Pritzel in his Repertorium Specierum Novarum Regni Vegetabilis from specimens collected by Herbert Basedow in 1903 in central Australia.

== Distribution and habitat ==
This species of indigofera grows in coarse gravel or sand on hils, ridges and in creek beds or at the base of hills in the Burt Plain, Central Ranges, Finke, Flinders Lofty Block, Great Sandy Desert, MacDonnell Ranges and Simpson Strzelecki Dunefields bioregions of the Northern Territory and in the north-west of South Australia.
