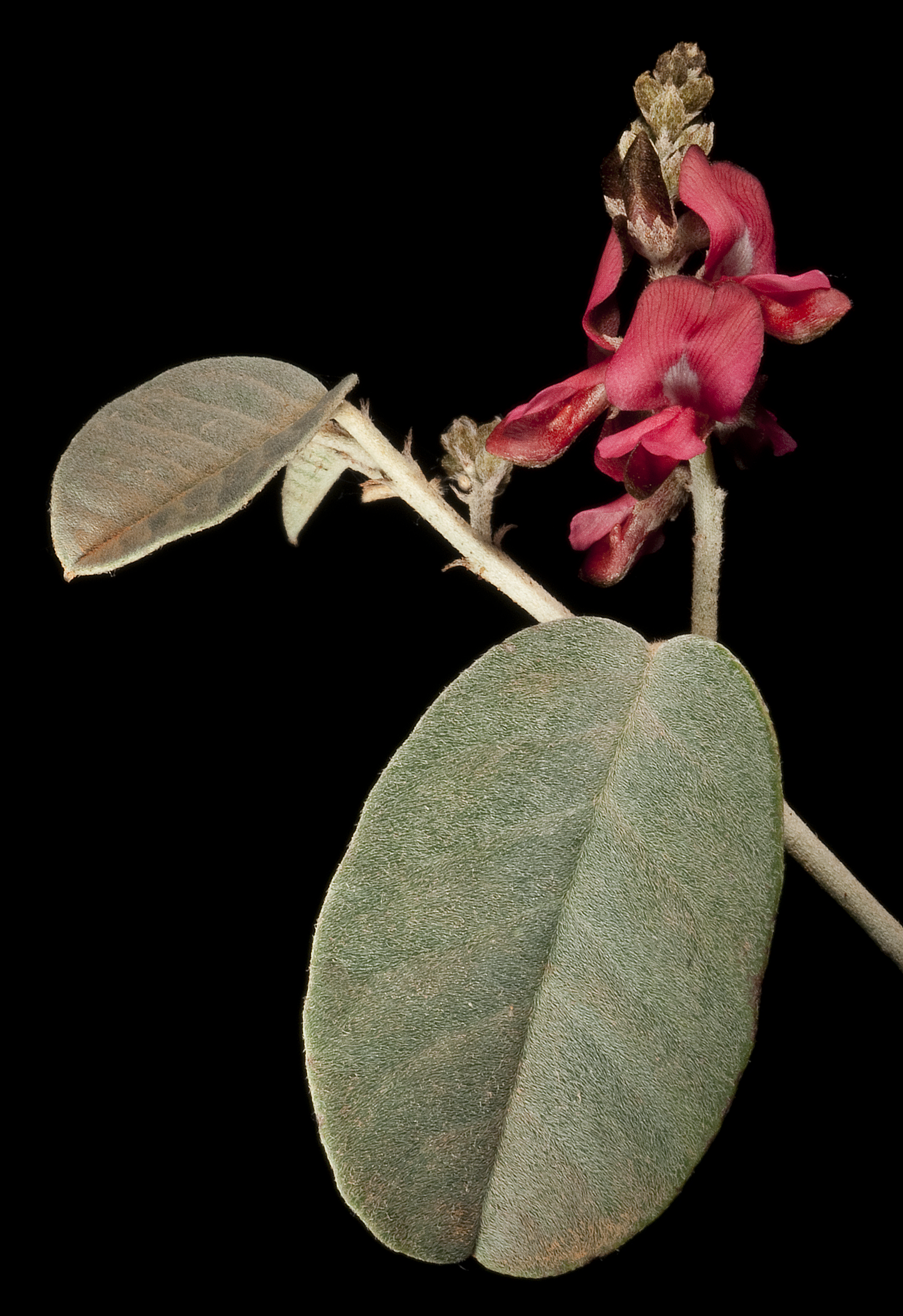

Scientific classification
- Kingdom: Plantae
- Clade: Tracheophytes
- Clade: Angiosperms
- Clade: Eudicots
- Clade: Rosids
- Order: Fabales
- Family: Fabaceae
- Subfamily: Faboideae
- Genus: Indigofera
- Species: I. monophylla

Binomial name
- Indigofera monophylla D.C

= Indigofera monophylla =

Species of plant

Indigofera monophylla is a flowering plant in the family Fabaceae and grows in Western Australia and the Northern Territory. It is a small, spreading shrub with purplish red flowers.

== Description ==
Indigofera monophylla is a sparse shrub with hairy, ridged stems and simple alternate leaves 15–50 mm (0.59–1.97 in) long, entire leaf width 7–24 mm (0.28–0.94 in) wide. Corolla may be a single colour either purple or red or a combination, 8–9.7 mm (0.31–0.38 in) long, wings 6–7 mm (0.24–0.28 in) wide, keel 8–9.5 mm (0.31–0.37 in) wide and the calyx 2.6–3 mm (0.10–0.12 in) long. Flowering occurs from March to October and the fruit is a pod.

== Taxonomy and naming ==
Indigofera monophylla was first formally described in 1825 by Augustin Pyramus de Candolle and the description was published in Prodromus Systematis Naturalis Regni Vegetabilis. The specific epithet (monophylla) means 'leaved'.

== Distribution and habitat ==
This species of Indigofera grows in Western Australia and the Northern Territory.
