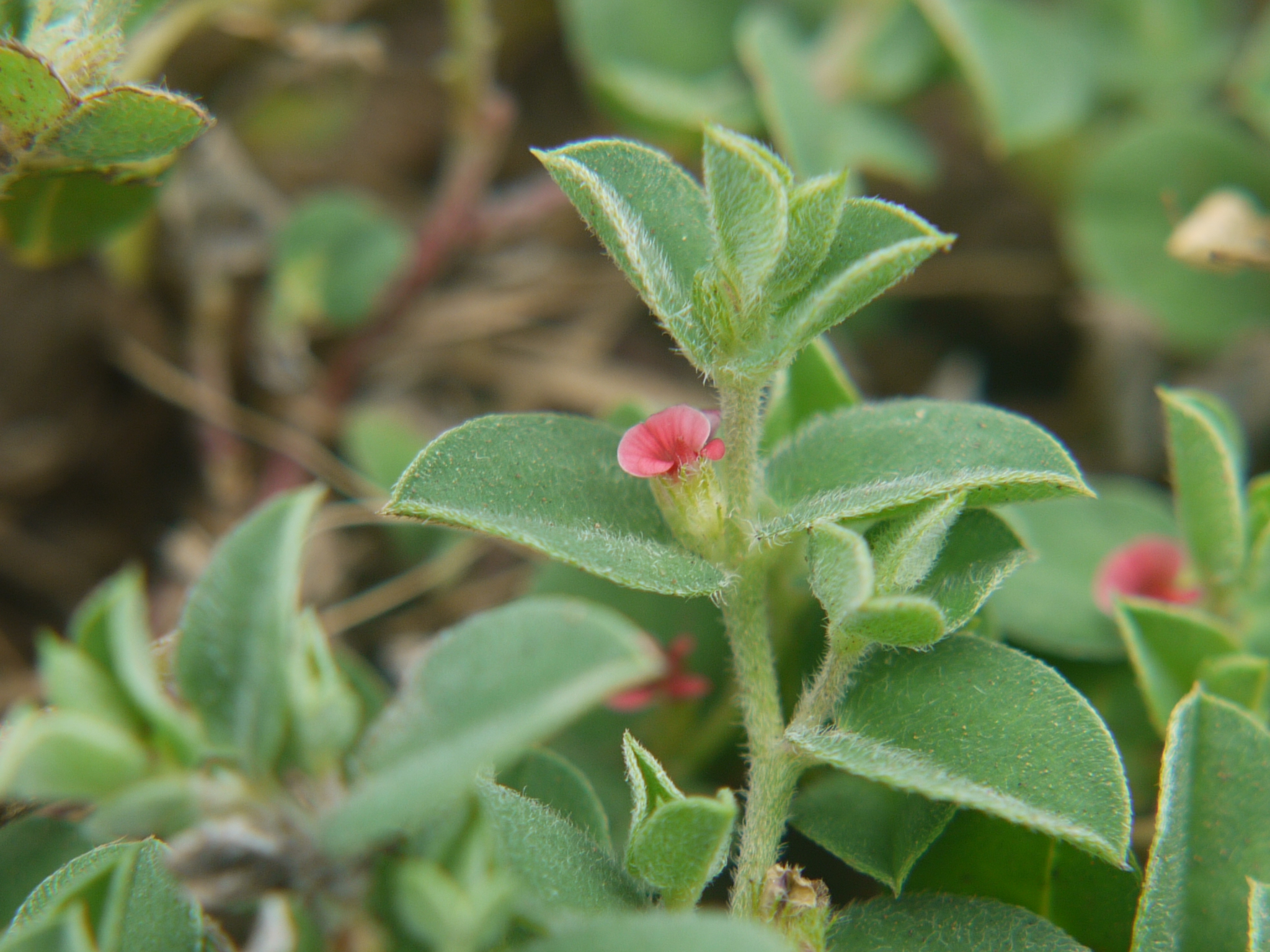
- Flowers are minuscule.
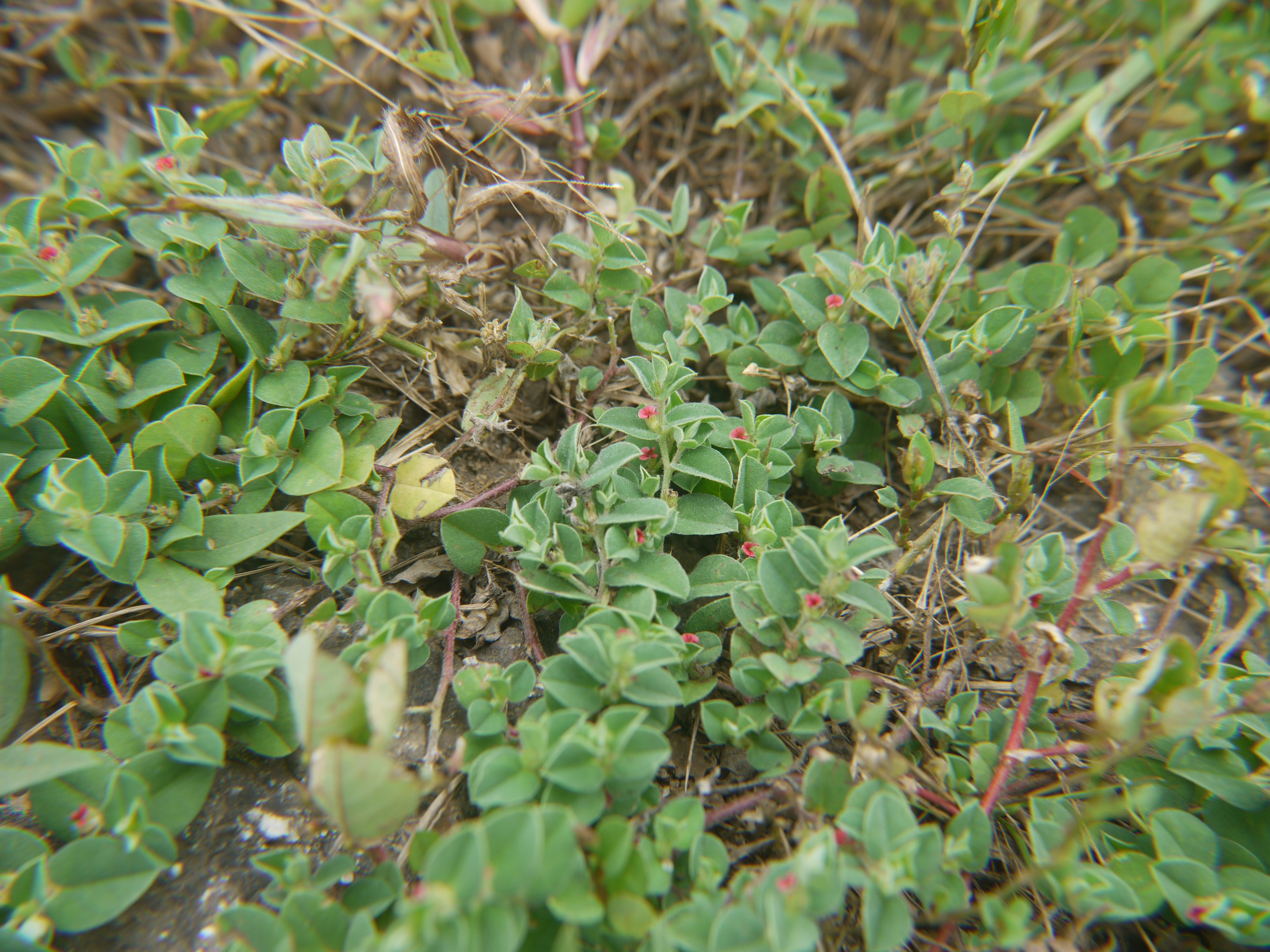
- Habit

Scientific classification
- Kingdom: Plantae
- Clade: Tracheophytes
- Clade: Angiosperms
- Clade: Eudicots
- Clade: Rosids
- Order: Fabales
- Family: Fabaceae
- Subfamily: Faboideae
- Genus: Indigofera
- Species: I. cordifolia

Binomial name
- Indigofera cordifolia B.Heyne ex Roth

Synonyms
- Anil cordifolia (B.Heyne ex Roth) Kuntze; Heylandia cordifolia (B.Heyne ex Roth) Graham

= Indigofera cordifolia =

Species of flowering plant

Indigofera cordifolia, the heart-leaf indigo, is a species of flowering plant in the family Fabaceae. It is found from the Cape Verde Islands, across the Sahel to Oman, the Indian Subcontinent, Guangdong in China, and some of the islands of Indonesia, and it has been introduced to the Northern Territory of Australia. A glycophyte adapted to sandy soils, it is considered a weed in some situations, but can also improve crop yields due to its nitrogen-fixing ability.
