= Indigofera rothii =

Conservation status
- Endangered (IUCN 3.1)

Scientific classification
- Kingdom: Plantae
- Clade: Tracheophytes
- Clade: Angiosperms
- Clade: Eudicots
- Clade: Rosids
- Order: Fabales
- Family: Fabaceae
- Subfamily: Faboideae
- Genus: Indigofera
- Species: I. rothii

Binomial name
- Indigofera rothii Bak.

Species of legume

Indigofera rothii is a species of plant in the family Fabaceae. It is found only in Ethiopia.
