= Indigofera =

- Indigofera tinctoria

Scientific classification
- Kingdom: Plantae
- Clade: Tracheophytes
- Clade: Angiosperms
- Clade: Eudicots
- Clade: Rosids
- Order: Fabales
- Family: Fabaceae
- Subfamily: Faboideae
- Tribe: Indigofereae
- Genus: Indigofera; L.

Type species
- Indigofera tinctoria L.

Species
- See text.

Synonyms
- Acanthonotus Benth. (1849); Amecarpus Benth. (1847); Bremontiera DC. (1825); Brissonia Neck. (1790), opus utique oppr.; Eleimanthus Hochst. (1846); Elasmocarpus Hochst. ex Chiov. (1903 publ. 1902); Hemispadon Endl. (1832); Indigo Adans. (1763); Oustropis G.Don (1832); Sphaeridiophorum Desv. (1813); Tricoilendus Raf. (1837); Vaughania S.Moore (1920)

Genus of plants

Indigofera is a large genus of over 750 species of flowering plants belonging to the pea family Fabaceae and is widely distributed throughout the tropical and subtropical regions of the world. Plants in the genus Indigofera are perennial herbs, shrubs or subshrubs with simple, or divided leaves, flowers arranged in racemes in leaf axils, and fruit containing spherical, cylindrical or cube-shaped seeds.

== Description ==
Plants in the genus Indigofera are perennial herbs, subshrubs or shrubs, rarely annual herbs or small trees, that usually have soft hairs on the stems. The leaves are arranged alternately, unifoliate, trifoiate, or imparipinnate with five to many leaflets, often with stipules that are sometimes spiny.

The flowers are borne in racemes in leaf axils with more or less equal sepals, sometimes the lowermost sepals longer, the sinus between the upper lobes v- to u-shaped. The petals are red or pink to purple, sometimes white or yellow, the standard petal hairy on the lower surface and the keel sickle-shaped and hairy at the tip. There are ten stamens, three joined together and one free, the filaments alternating long and short, the anthers glabrous, with tufts of hairs. The ovary is sessile, usually hairy, with one, two or many ovules.

The fruit is linear, oblong, egg-shaped, cylindrical or four-sided in cross section and usually dehiscent, but show a trend towards indehiscence.

== Species ==
As of April 2025, Plants of the World Online accepted over 760 species worldwide.

Selected species:

- Indigofera adesmiifolia A.Gray (N.S.W., Vic., Qld., A.C.T.)
- Indigofera amblyantha Craib (China)
- Indigofera ammobia Maconochie (W.A., N.T.)
- Indigofera arrecta Hochst. ex A.Rich.
- Indigofera astragalina DC.
- Indigofera australis Willd.
- Indigofera basedowii E.Pritz. – showy indigo (N.T., S.A.)
- Indigofera boviperda Morrison (W.A.)
- Indigofera candicans Aiton
- Indigofera caroliniana Mill.
- Indigofera cassioides Rottler ex DC.
- Indigofera cloiselii Drake
- Indigofera cordifolia B.Heyne ex Roth
- Indigofera decora Lindl.
- Indigofera galegoides DC.
- Indigofera georgei E.Pritz.
- Indigofera glaucescens Eckl. & Zeyh.
- Indigofera hendecaphylla Jacq.
- Indigofera heterantha Wall. ex Brandis
- Indigofera hilaris Eckl. & Zeyh.
- Indigofera himalayensis Ali
- Indigofera hirsuta L.
- Indigofera howellii Craib & W.W.Sm.
- Indigofera kirilowii Maxim. ex Palibin
- Indigofera linifolia (L.f.) Retz.
- Indigofera marmorata Balf.f.
- Indigofera miniata Ortega
- Indigofera monophylla DC.
- Indigofera nephrocarpoides J.B.Gillett
- Indigofera nummulariifolia (L.) Livera ex Alston
- Indigofera pendula Franch.
- Indigofera rothii Baker
- Indigofera sokotrana Vierh.
- Indigofera spicata Forssk.
- Indigofera suffruticosa Mill.
- Indigofera szechuensis Craib
- Indigofera tinctoria L.
- Indigofera tsiangiana Metcalf

== Ecology ==
Indigofera species are used as food plants by the larvae of some Lepidoptera species, including the turnip moth (Agrotis segetum).

== Uses ==
=== Indigo dye ===
Several species, especially Indigofera tinctoria and Indigofera suffruticosa, are used to produce the dye indigo. Scraps of Indigo-dyed fabric likely dyed with plants from the genus Indigofera discovered at Huaca Prieta predate Egyptian indigo-dyed fabrics by more than 1,500 years. Colonial planters in the Caribbean grew indigo and transplanted its cultivation when they settled in the colony of South Carolina and North Carolina where people of the Tuscarora confederacy adopted the dyeing process for head wraps and clothing. Exports of the crop did not expand until the mid-to late 18th century. When Eliza Lucas Pinckney and enslaved Africans successfully cultivated new strains near Charleston it became the second most important cash crop in the colony (after rice) before the American Revolution. It comprised more than one-third of all exports in value.

The chemical aniline, from which many important dyes are derived, was first synthesized from Indigofera suffruticosa (syn. Indigofera anil, whence the name aniline).

In Indonesia, the Sundanese use Indigofera tinctoria (known locally as tarum or nila) as dye for batik. Marco Polo was the first to report on the preparation of indigo in India. Indigo was quite often used in European easel painting during the Middle Ages.

== See also ==
- Baptisia (false indigo)—a related genus.
- Amorpha fruticosa
