= Indigofera galegoides =

Scientific classification
- Kingdom: Plantae
- Clade: Tracheophytes
- Clade: Angiosperms
- Clade: Eudicots
- Clade: Rosids
- Order: Fabales
- Family: Fabaceae
- Subfamily: Faboideae
- Genus: Indigofera
- Species: I. galegoides

Binomial name
- Indigofera galegoides DC.

Synonyms
- Anil galegoides (DC.) Kuntze; Indigofera finlaysoniana Ridl.; Indigofera mansuensis Hayata; Indigofera uncinata Roxb.; Indigofera uncinata var. minor Ewart & L.R.Kerr

Species of plant in the legume family

Indigofera galegoides is a species of flowering plant in the family Fabaceae, native to India, South East Asia, Malesia, and southern China. It is a shrub usually 2 m (6 ft) high and indigo dye may be extracted from it by the same harvesting and processing methods as Indigofera tinctoria. It grows in open places and valleys.
