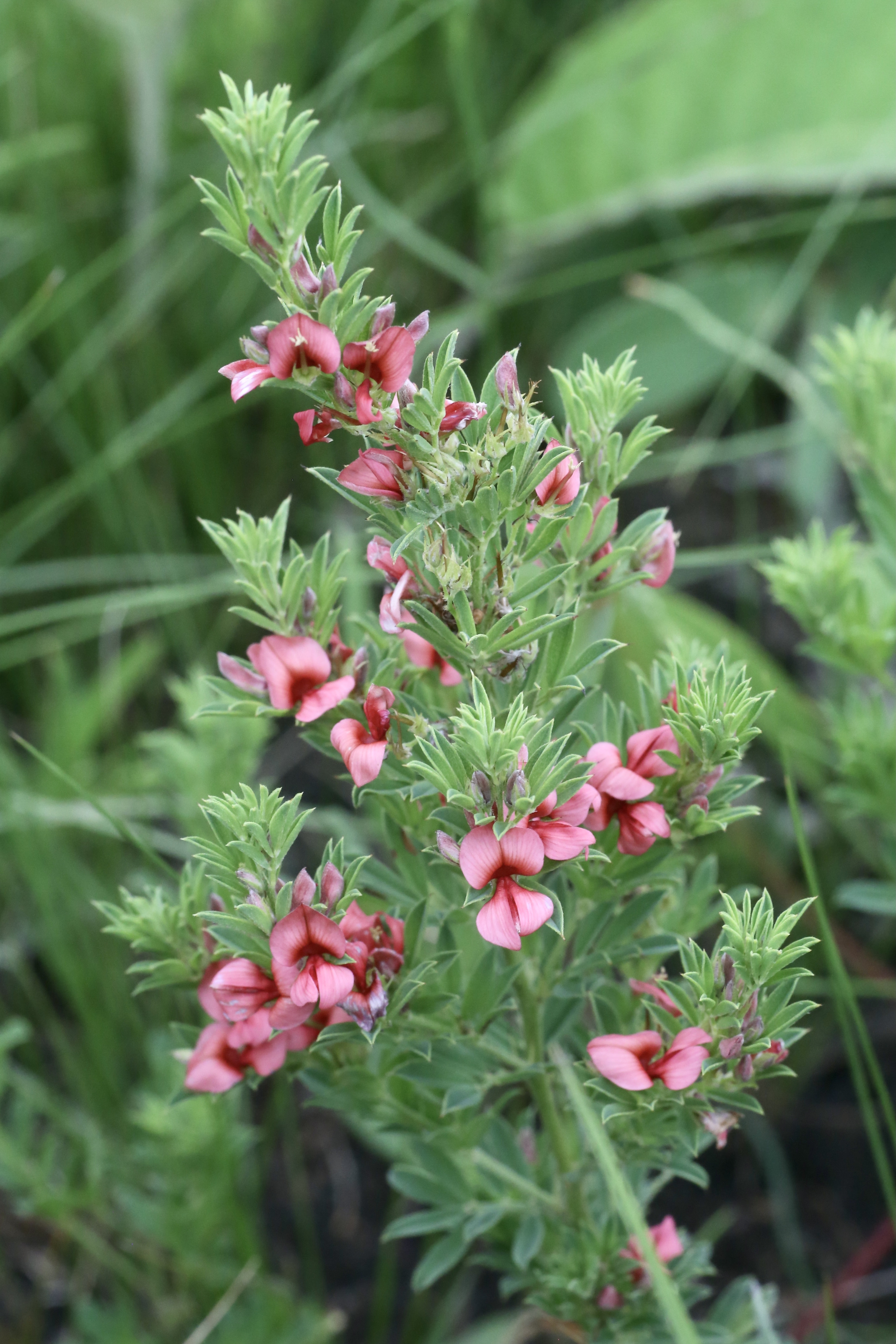
- Indigofera hilaris var. hilaris in Vernon Crookes Nature Reserve, KwaZulu-Natal

Conservation status
- Least Concern (IUCN 3.1)

Scientific classification
- Kingdom: Plantae
- Clade: Tracheophytes
- Clade: Angiosperms
- Clade: Eudicots
- Clade: Rosids
- Order: Fabales
- Family: Fabaceae
- Subfamily: Faboideae
- Genus: Indigofera
- Species: I. hilaris

Binomial name
- Indigofera hilaris Eckl. & Zeyh.

Synonyms
- Indigofera hirta E.Mey. (1836); Indigofera compacta N.E.Br. (1925); Indigofera leipzigiae Bremek. (1933)

= Indigofera hilaris =

Species of plant

Indigofera hilaris, the red bush indigo or gay indigofera, is a species of leguminous shrublet in the genus Indigofera (family Fabaceae).

== Etymology ==
The genus name Indigofera is Neo-Latin for "bearing indigo" (indigo is a purple dye originally obtained from some Indigofera species). Hilaris, from the Ancient Greek, means "cheerful, merry", referring to the bright, colourful display of the flowers.

== Description ==
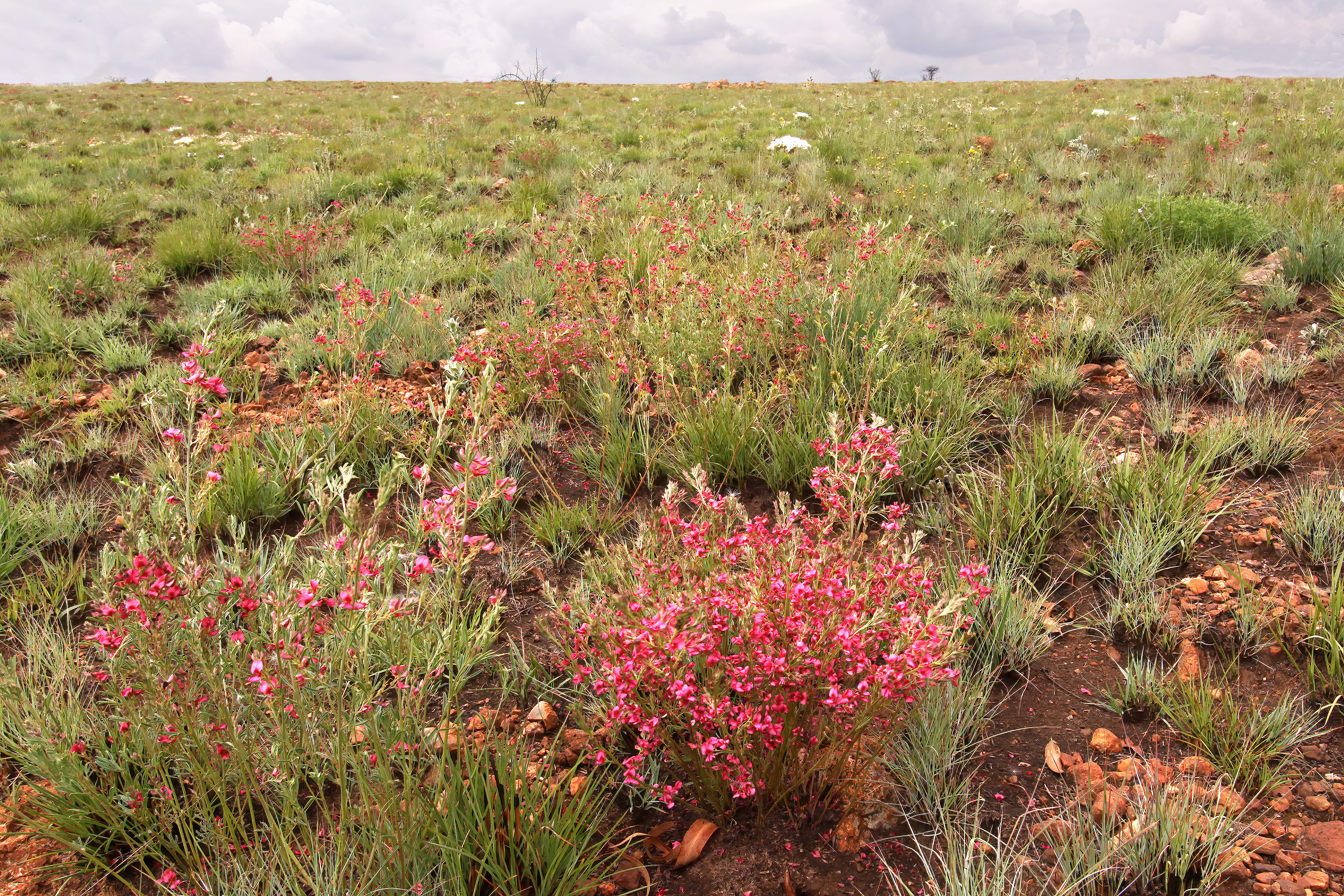
Flowering plants in recently burned grassland, Gauteng, South Africa

Indigofera hilaris is a perennial shrublet with erect annual stems up to 60 cm from a thick woody rootstock. Leaves are pinnate, with one to four pairs of narrow elliptical, silky and often folded leaflets; basal leaves are reduced, becoming scaly. Stipules are 2–9 mm long, linear and stiff. Inflorescences are short-stalked densely-flowered 1.5–5 cm long racemes, scarcely longer than the leaves. Flowers are reddish-pink to carmine, 7–8 mm long and about 6 mm in diameter. Pods are 10–30 mm long, cylindrical and straight. Flowers bloom from July to December, especially after fires.

== Distribution ==
Indigofera hilaris grows in open grasslands through eastern South and tropical Africa in Tanzania, Zambia, Zaire, Malawi, Mozambique, Zimbabwe, Eswatini, Lesotho and South Africa (Limpopo, Mpumalanga, Gauteng, North-West, Free State, KwaZulu-Natal, Eastern Cape).
