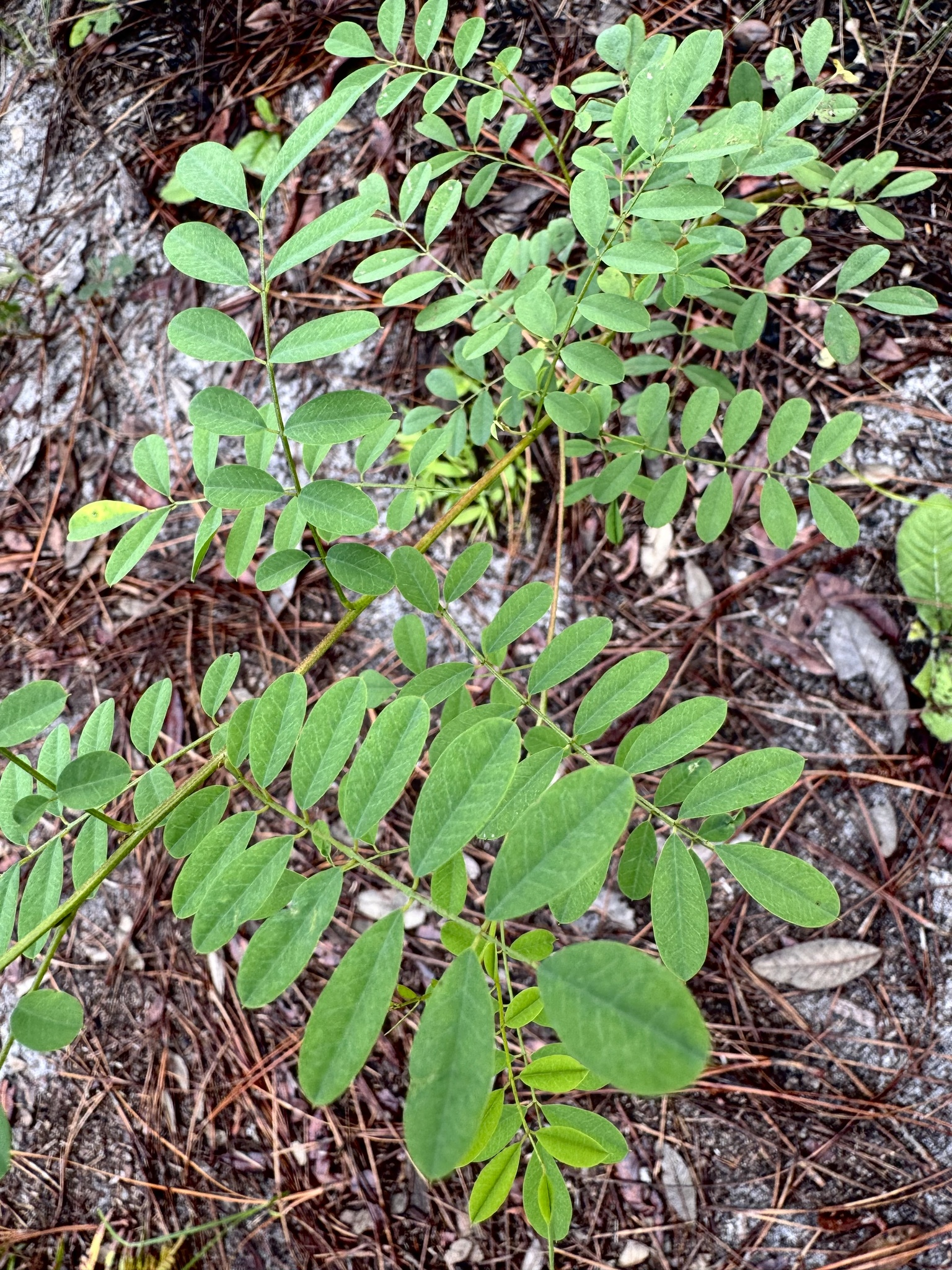

Scientific classification
- Kingdom: Plantae
- Clade: Tracheophytes
- Clade: Angiosperms
- Clade: Eudicots
- Clade: Rosids
- Order: Fabales
- Family: Fabaceae
- Subfamily: Faboideae
- Genus: Indigofera
- Species: I. caroliniana

Binomial name
- Indigofera caroliniana Mill.

= Indigofera caroliniana =

Species of plant

Indigofera caroliniana, the Carolina indigo, is a suffruticose herbaceous plant in the legume family that is endemic to the Coastal Plain of the Southeastern United States.

== Description ==
Indigofera caroliniana is a suffruticose (partially woody) herbaceous plant, typically 0.5–1.2 m tall, occasionally reaching 2 m. Leaves are 5–10 cm long, odd-pinnate, with a finely hairy rachis and 9–15 obovate to oblanceolate leaflets, each 1–2.5 cm long and 5–10 mm wide. Both surfaces are minutely strigillose, with trichomes appearing attached at their midpoint; leaflets are stipellate. Inflorescences are slender, axillary or terminal racemes, 6–20 cm long, usually exceeding the subtending leaf. Flowers are loosely arranged, each on a ~1 mm pedicel with a small triangular bract. Petals are pinkish to yellowish-brown; the standard and keel are 5–6 mm long, wings slightly shorter and adherent to the pouched keel. Stamens are diadelphous (9+1), with the connective extending above the anthers. The fruit is a short-stipitate, beaked legume, 5–10 mm long, containing one to three seeds.

Indigofera caroliniana has stem tubers in its root system that store non-structural carbohydrates. These allow it to resprout after fire and for the plant to persist through periods of fire exclusion.

== Distribution and habitat ==
Indigofera caroliniana is found from Eastern North Carolina south to South Florida and west to Southeastern Louisiana. It grows in longleaf pine sandhills, maritime forests, Florida scrub, and other sandy forests and woodlands.
