= Indigofera boviperda =

- Near the Denham Lookout Road

Scientific classification
- Kingdom: Plantae
- Clade: Tracheophytes
- Clade: Angiosperms
- Clade: Eudicots
- Clade: Rosids
- Order: Fabales
- Family: Fabaceae
- Subfamily: Faboideae
- Genus: Indigofera
- Species: I. boviperda

Binomial name
- Indigofera boviperda Morrison
- Occurrence data from AVH

Species of plant

Indigofera boviperda is a species of flowering plant in the family Fabaceae and is endemic to northern Western Australia. It is an erect, spreading or low-lying subshrub or perennial herb with pinnate leaves, pink to purple flowers and descending, terete pods.

== Description ==
Indigofera boviperda is an erect, spreading or low-lying subshrub or perennial herb that typically grows to a height of 15–70 cm (5.9–27.6 in) and 100 cm (39 in) wide and has densely hairy, terete stems. The leaves are pinnate with 3 to 9 leaflets 9–45 mm (0.35–1.77 in) long on a petiole 2.5–10 mm (0.098–0.394 in) long with narrow triangular or lance-shaped stipules 1.2–3.7 mm (0.047–0.146 in) long. The flowers are arranged in groups 15–150 mm (0.59–5.91 in) long, and longer than the leaves, each flower on a peduncle mostly 4–26 mm (0.16–1.02 in) long, the calyx 1.6–3.9 mm (0.063–0.154 in) long, and covered in white, grey or brown hairs. The standard petal is egg-shaped to broadly elliptical, 4.6–6.9 mm (0.18–0.27 in) long and 3.2–5.6 mm (0.13–0.22 in) wide, the wings 3.3–6.5 mm (0.13–0.26 in) long and spoon-shaped, and the keel 4.3–7 mm (0.17–0.28 in) long. Flowering occurs from April to September and the fruit is a descending, terete, grey to brown pod, mostly 15–27 mm (0.59–1.06 in) long with dense, more or less spreading hairs, and 3 to 8 seeds.

== Taxonomy ==
Indigofera boviperda was first formally described in 1912 by Alexander Morrison in the Journal of Botany, British and Foreign from specimens he collected near the Ashburton River. The specific epithet (boviperda) means 'ox destroyer', referring to the deaths of 120 cattle that had apparently grazed on the plant. (Charles Austin Gardner and Harold William Bennetts in "The Toxic Plants of Western Australia" suggested that a species of Euphorbia was more likely to have been responsible for the deaths.)

In 2015, Peter Wilson and Robert Ross, described a subspecies of I. boviperda, and its name and that of the autonym are accepted by the Australian Plant Census:

- Indigofera boviperda Morrison subsp. boviperda (the autonym) has mostly pinnate leaves with five to nine leaflets.
- Indigofera boviperda subsp. eremaea Peter G.Wilson & Rowe has leaves with mostly three leaflets.

== Distribution and habitat ==
This species of indigofera grows in red sand, sandy loam or clay on pindan plains in the Carnarvon, Dampierland, Gascoyne, Gibson Desert, Great Sandy Desert, Little Sandy Desert and Pilbara bioregions in the north of Western Australia.

- Subspecies boviperda grows mostly on red sand or sandy loam of interdunes or plains in the Carnarvon, Gascoyne, Little Sandy Desert, and Pilbara bioregions.
- Subspecies eremaea grows in sand dune swales in and around the Great Sandy Desert in the Gibson Desert, Great Sandy Desert, Little Sandy Desert, and Pilbara bioregions.

== Conservation status ==
Both subspecies of Indigofera boviperda are listed as "least concern" by the Government of Western Australia Department of Biodiversity, Conservation and Attractions.
