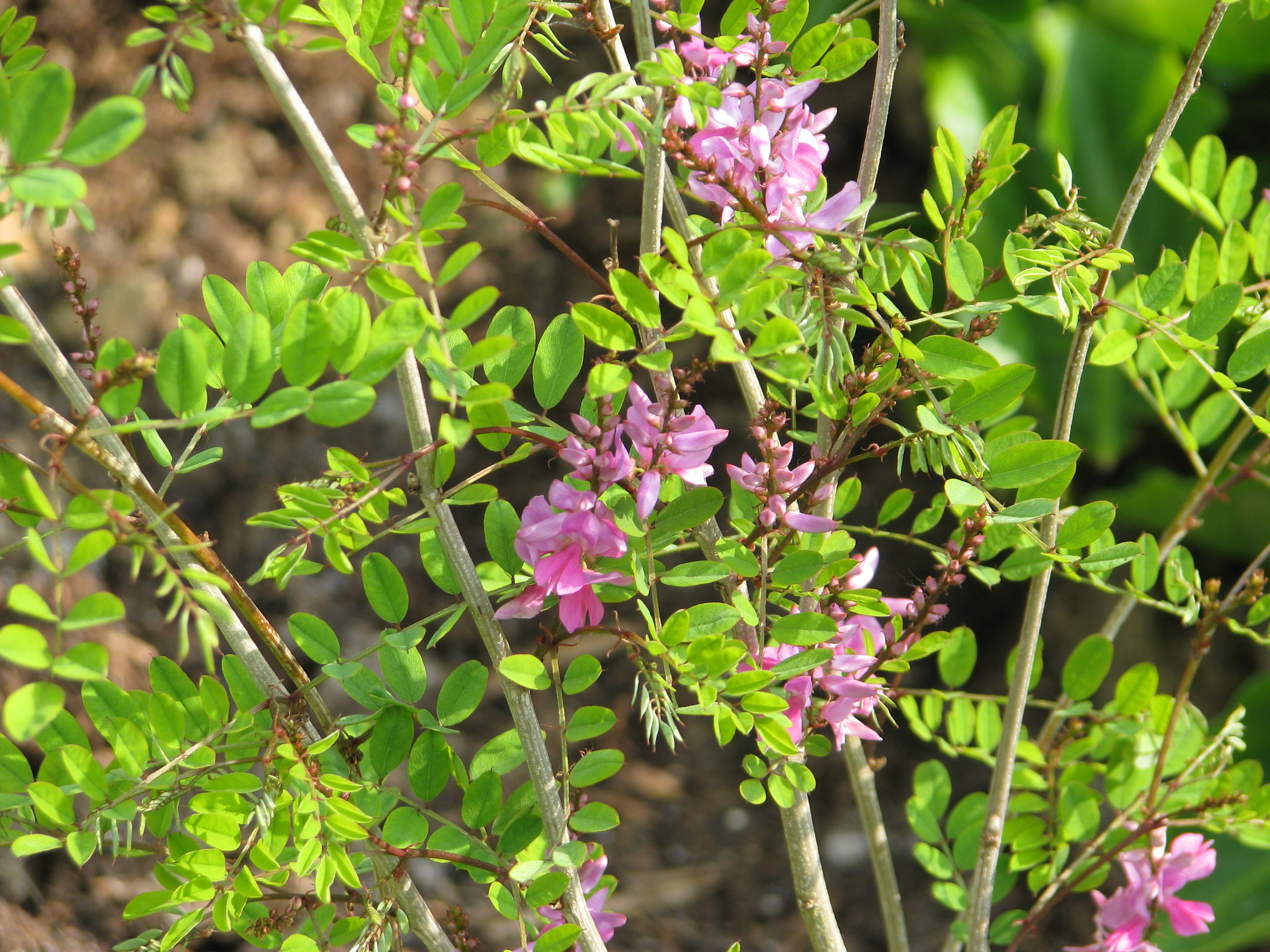
- 'Silk Road' cultivar

Scientific classification
- Kingdom: Plantae
- Clade: Tracheophytes
- Clade: Angiosperms
- Clade: Eudicots
- Clade: Rosids
- Order: Fabales
- Family: Fabaceae
- Subfamily: Faboideae
- Genus: Indigofera
- Species: I. himalayensis

Binomial name
- Indigofera himalayensis Ali

= Indigofera himalayensis =

Species of plant in the legume family

Indigofera himalayensis, the Himalayan indigo, is a species of flowering plant in the family Fabaceae, native to the western Himalayas. It is a deciduous shrub reaching 1.5 m (5 ft), with a cultivar called 'Silk Road' that is readily available in commerce.
