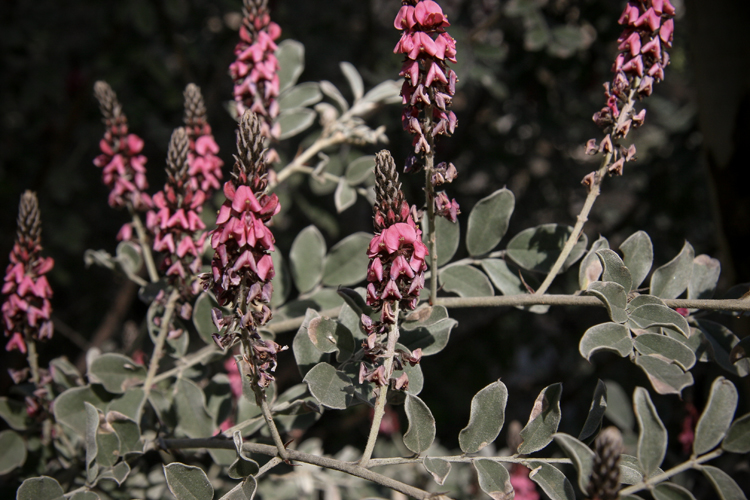

Scientific classification
- Kingdom: Plantae
- Clade: Tracheophytes
- Clade: Angiosperms
- Clade: Eudicots
- Clade: Rosids
- Order: Fabales
- Family: Fabaceae
- Subfamily: Faboideae
- Genus: Indigofera
- Species: I. georgei

Binomial name
- Indigofera georgei E.Pritz.

= Indigofera georgei =

George's indigo

Species of plant

Indigofera georgei commonly known as George's indigo or bovine indigo is a flowering plant in the family Fabaceae and grows in Queensland, South Australia, Western Australia and the Northern Territory. It has greyish green leaves and mauve to red flowers.

== Description ==
Indigofera georgei is a decumbent or upright broom-like shrub with woody, ribbed stems covered in whitish woolly hairs. Leaves are 3-7 leaflets, alternate, 10–18 mm (0.39–0.71 in) long, 4–8 mm (0.16–0.31 in) wide and rounded at the apex. Flowers are mauve to red, pea-like and borne in spikes. Flowering occurs from May to September and the fruit is a linear pod, 2–35 mm (0.079–1.378 in) long, 2–3 mm (0.079–0.118 in) wide and covered in white hairs.

== Taxonomy and naming ==
Indigofera georgei was first formally described in 1904 by Ernst Georg Pritzel and the description was published in Botanische Jahrbücher für Systematik, Pflanzengeschichte und Pflanzengeographie. The specific epithet (georgei) is named in honor of William James George.

== Distribution and habitat ==
George's indigo grows on rocky hill slopes, sandy soils and stony clays in Queensland, South Australia, Western Australia and the Northern Territory.
