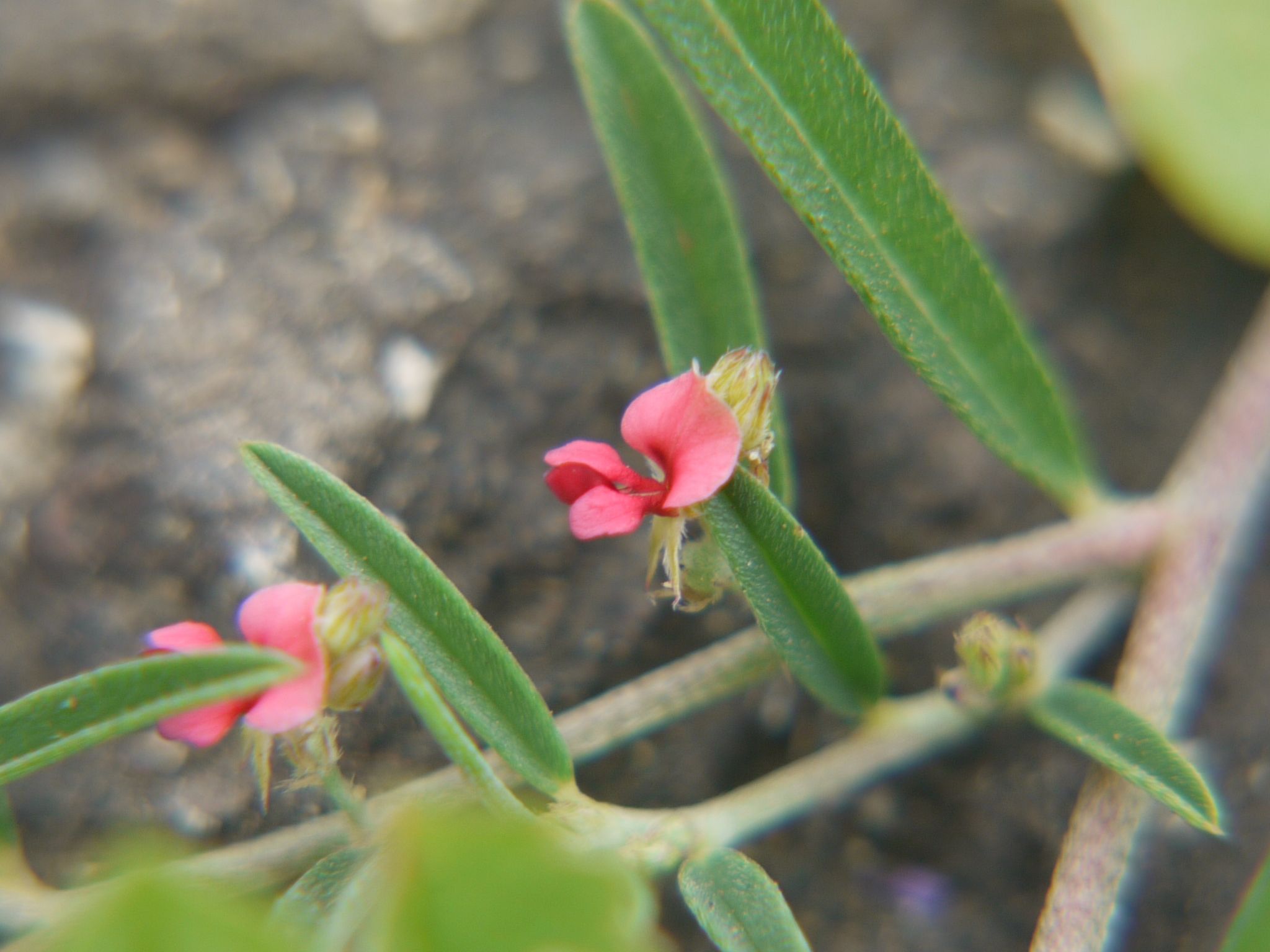
- Close-up of flowers
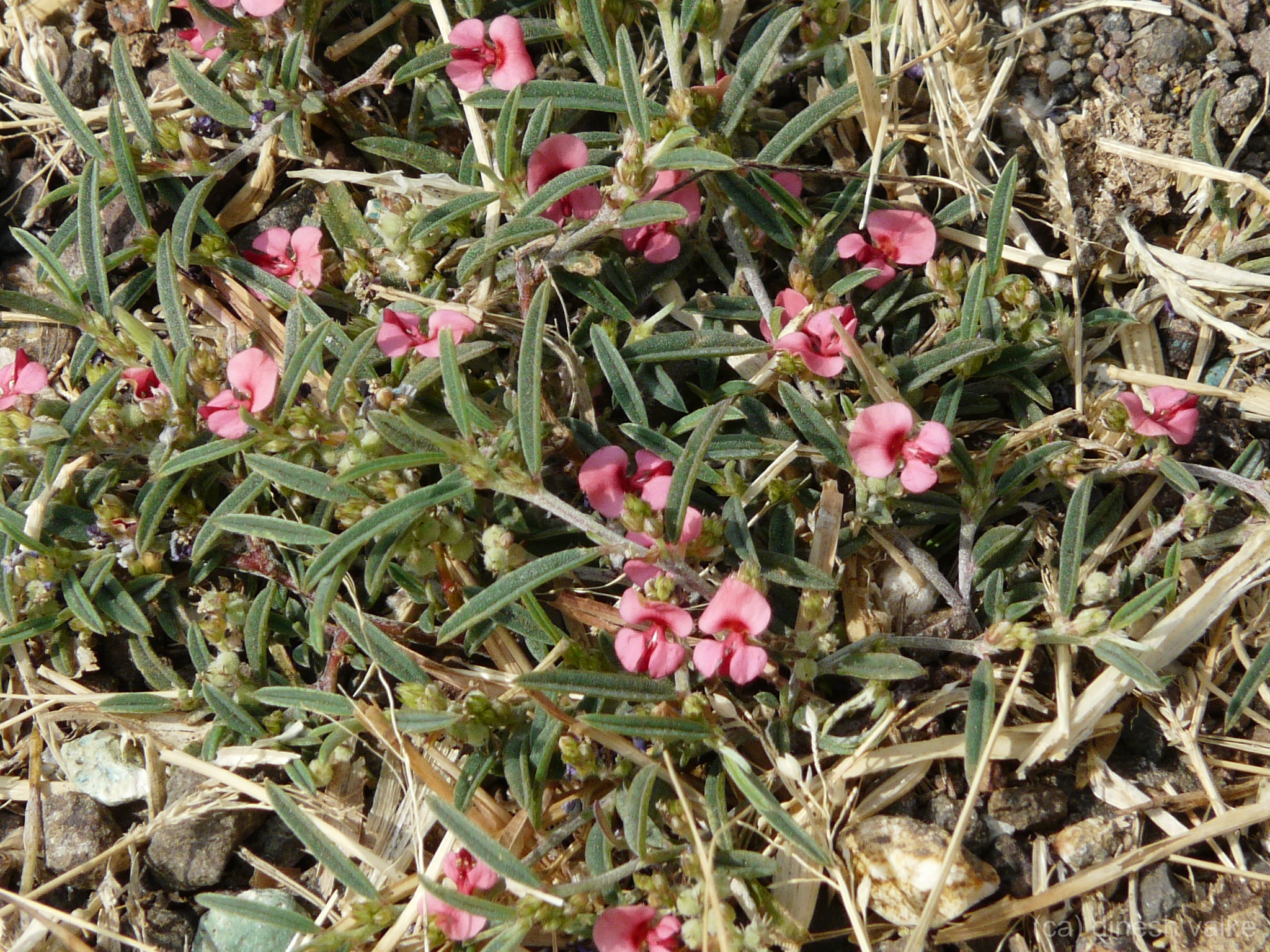
- Habit

Scientific classification
- Kingdom: Plantae
- Clade: Tracheophytes
- Clade: Angiosperms
- Clade: Eudicots
- Clade: Rosids
- Order: Fabales
- Family: Fabaceae
- Subfamily: Faboideae
- Genus: Indigofera
- Species: I. linifolia

Binomial name
- Indigofera linifolia (L.f.) Retz.

Synonyms
- List: Anil linifolia (L.f.) Kuntze; Anil linifolia var. lanceolata Kuntze; Anil linifolia var. normalis Kuntze; Hallia glauca Zipp. ex Span.; Hedysarum linifolium L.f.; Indigofera albicans Span.; Indigofera albicans R.Br.; Indigofera linifolia subsp. campbellii (Wight) Panigrahi & Murti; Indigofera polygonoides J.C.Wendl.; Indigofera roxburghii Tausch; Sphaeridiophorum abyssinicum Jaub. & Spach

= Indigofera linifolia =

Species of flowering plant

Indigofera linifolia, the narrowleaf indigo, is a species of flowering plant in the family Fabaceae. It is very widely distributed from Sudan eastwards to the Indian Subcontinent, Southeast Asia, Malesia, New Guinea and Australia, and it has been introduced to Réunion and New Caledonia. Livestock can consume it as fodder, and in times of famine humans can grind and bake the seeds into a bread. It grows on dry slopes, grasslands, and riversides.
