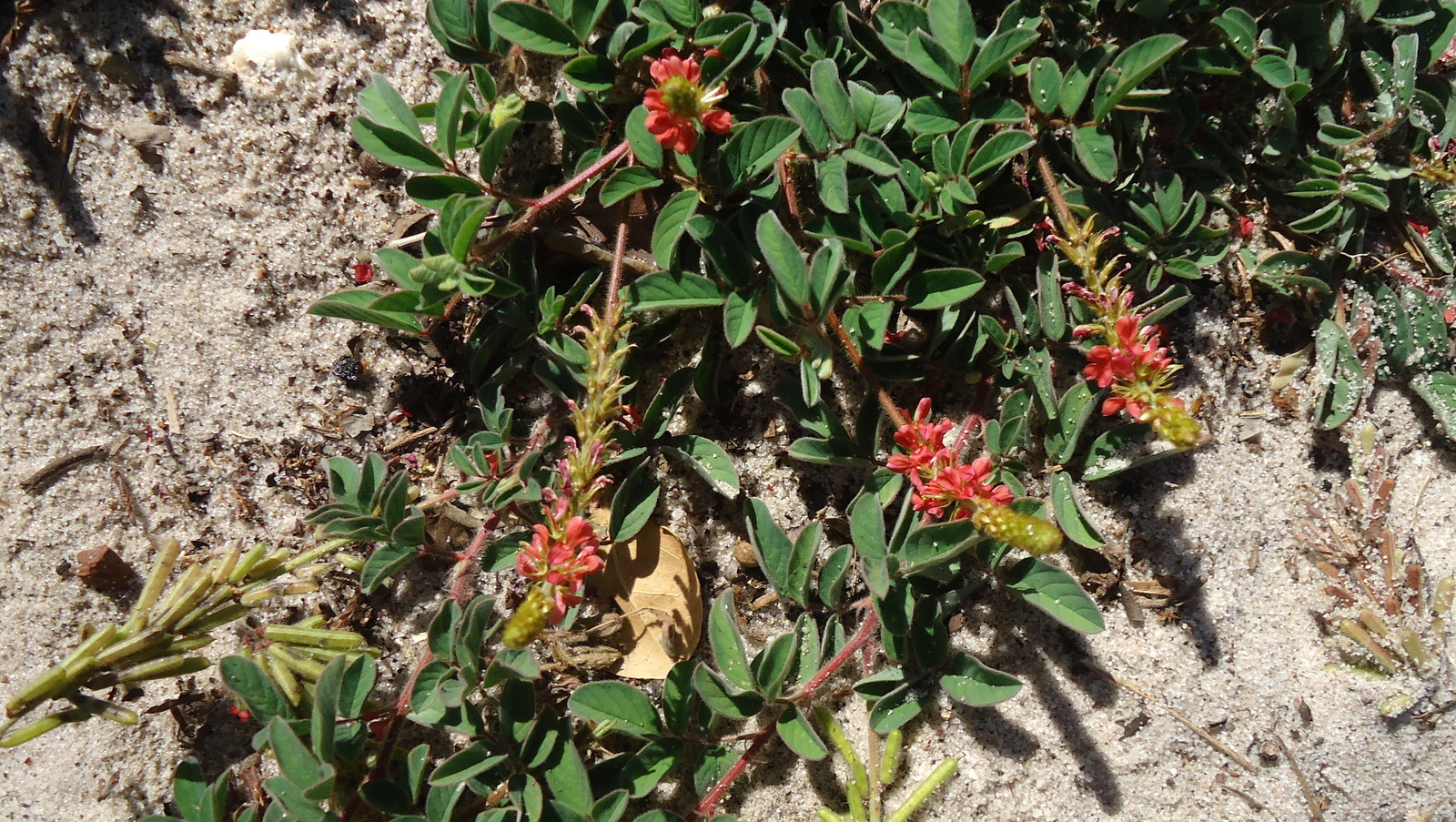
- Habit
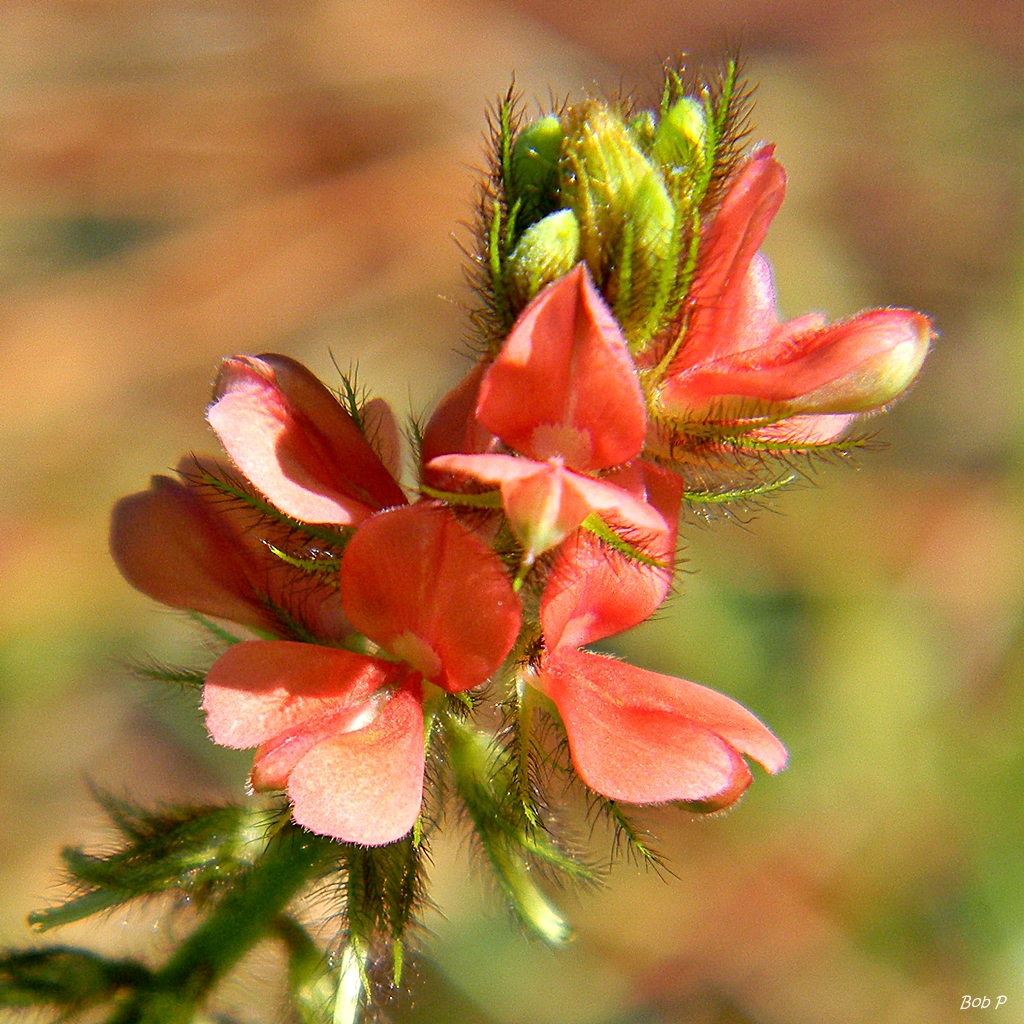
- Inflorescence

Scientific classification
- Kingdom: Plantae
- Clade: Tracheophytes
- Clade: Angiosperms
- Clade: Eudicots
- Clade: Rosids
- Order: Fabales
- Family: Fabaceae
- Subfamily: Faboideae
- Genus: Indigofera
- Species: I. hirsuta

Binomial name
- Indigofera hirsuta L.

Synonyms
- List: Anil hirsuta (L.) Kuntze; Astragalus spicatus Burm. ex Guill. & Perr.; Hedysarum coccineum Zipp. ex Miq.; Indigofera angustifolia Blanco; Indigofera barbata Desv.; Indigofera ferruginea Schumach. & Thonn.; Indigofera fusca G.Don; Indigofera hirta Bojer; Indigofera indica Mill.; Indigofera rhodosantha Zipp. ex Miq.

= Indigofera hirsuta =

Species of flowering plant

Indigofera hirsuta, the hairy indigo or rough hairy indigo, is a species of flowering plant in the family Fabaceae. It is native to nearly all the world's tropics; South America, Africa, Madagascar, the Indian Subcontinent, southern China, southeast Asia, Malesia, Papuasia and Australia, and has been introduced to the Caribbean, the southeast United States, Mexico and Central America. It is used as a green manure and, to a minor extent, for forage.
