= Indigofera sokotrana =

Conservation status
- Vulnerable (IUCN 3.1)

Scientific classification
- Kingdom: Plantae
- Clade: Tracheophytes
- Clade: Angiosperms
- Clade: Eudicots
- Clade: Rosids
- Order: Fabales
- Family: Fabaceae
- Subfamily: Faboideae
- Genus: Indigofera
- Species: I. sokotrana

Binomial name
- Indigofera sokotrana Vierh.

Species of legume

Indigofera sokotrana is a species of plant in the family Fabaceae. It is endemic to the Hajhir Mountains of Socotra in Yemen. The natural habitat of Indigofera sokotrana is subtropical or tropical dry forests.
