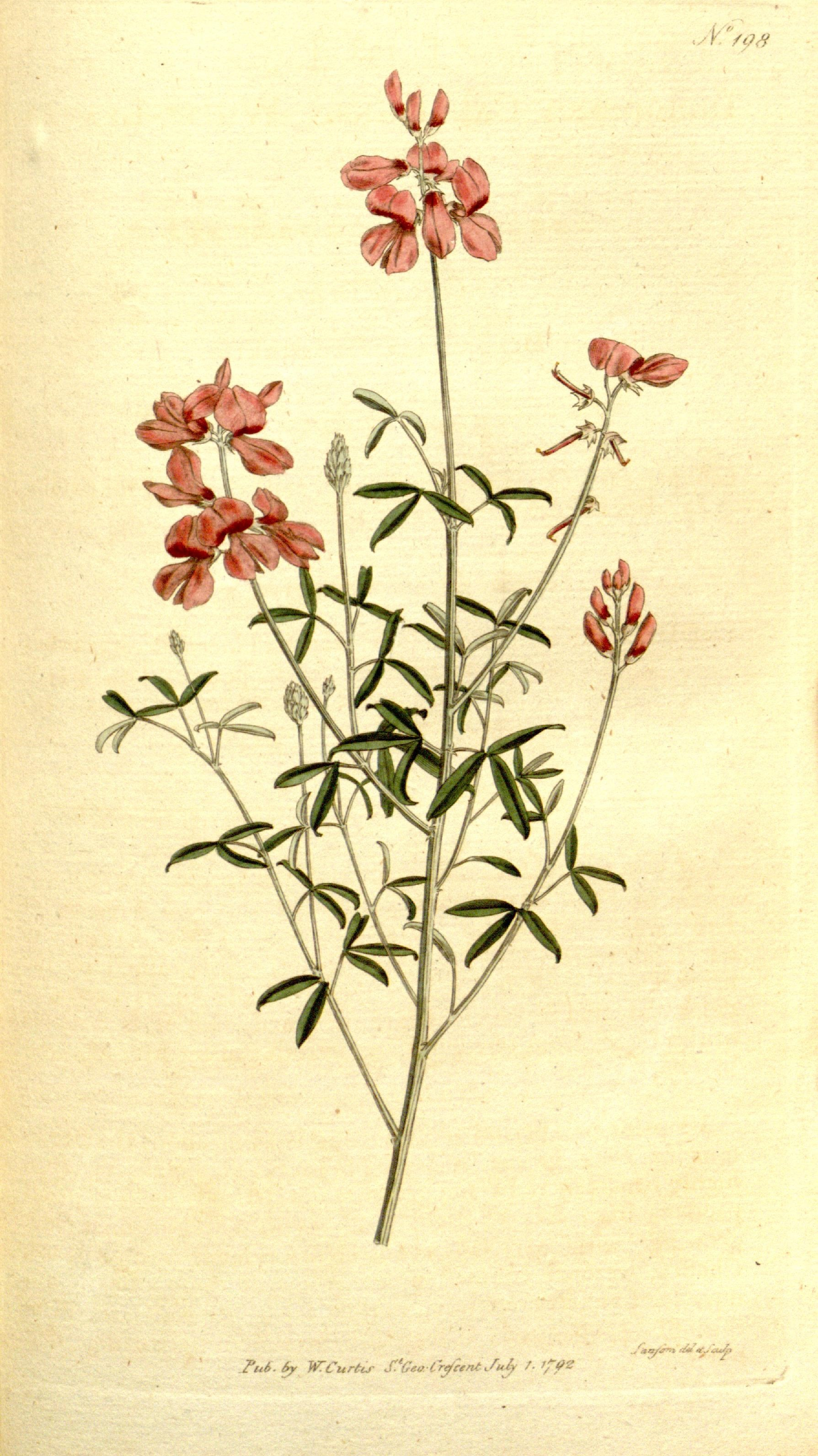
- Botanical illustration

Scientific classification
- Kingdom: Plantae
- Clade: Tracheophytes
- Clade: Angiosperms
- Clade: Eudicots
- Clade: Rosids
- Order: Fabales
- Family: Fabaceae
- Subfamily: Faboideae
- Genus: Indigofera
- Species: I. candicans

Binomial name
- Indigofera candicans Aiton

= Indigofera candicans =

Species of plant in the legume family

Indigofera candicans, the white-leaved indigo, is a species of flowering plant in the family Fabaceae, native to the Cape Provinces of South Africa. The stems and the undersides of the leaves are white.
