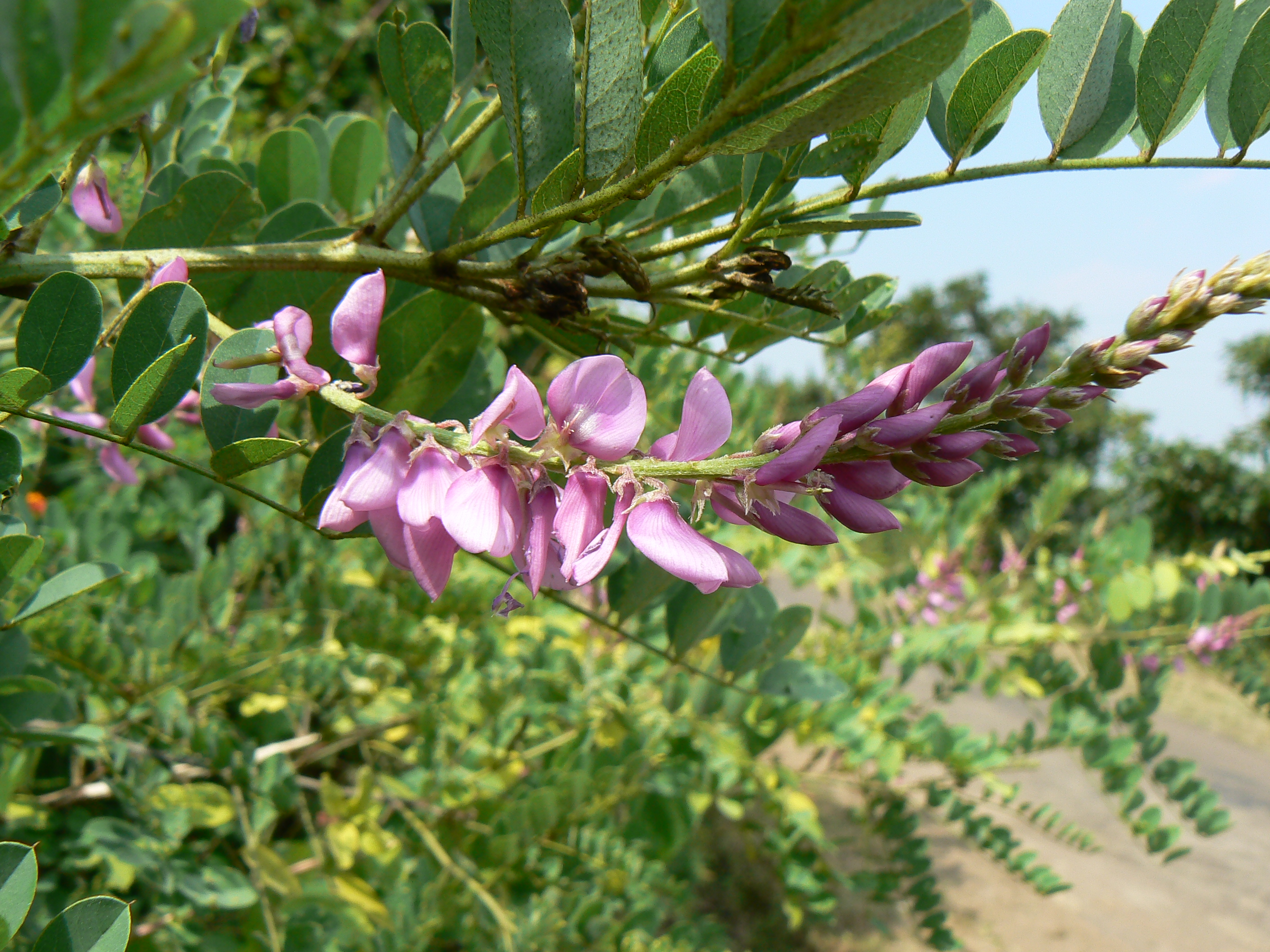
- Trained into a fence along a road in India

Scientific classification
- Kingdom: Plantae
- Clade: Tracheophytes
- Clade: Angiosperms
- Clade: Eudicots
- Clade: Rosids
- Order: Fabales
- Family: Fabaceae
- Subfamily: Faboideae
- Genus: Indigofera
- Species: I. cassioides

Binomial name
- Indigofera cassioides Rottler ex DC.

Synonyms
- List: Indigofera arborea Roxb.; Indigofera byansghatensis S.Biswas; Indigofera dubia Steud.; Indigofera elliptica Roxb.; Indigofera gibsonii J.Graham; Indigofera glaucescens Graham; Indigofera jirahulia Buch.-Ham.; Indigofera leptostachya DC.; Indigofera pulchella Roxb.; Indigofera purpurascens Roxb.; Indigofera verrucosa Graham; Indigofera violacea Roxb.

= Indigofera cassioides =

Species of flowering plant

Indigofera cassioides, the cassia indigo, is a species of flowering plant in the family Fabaceae. It is native to the Indian Subcontinent, Southeast Asia, southeast and south-central China, and Taiwan, and has been introduced to Sri Lanka and Kenya. Local artisans use its leaves to produce a blue dye.
