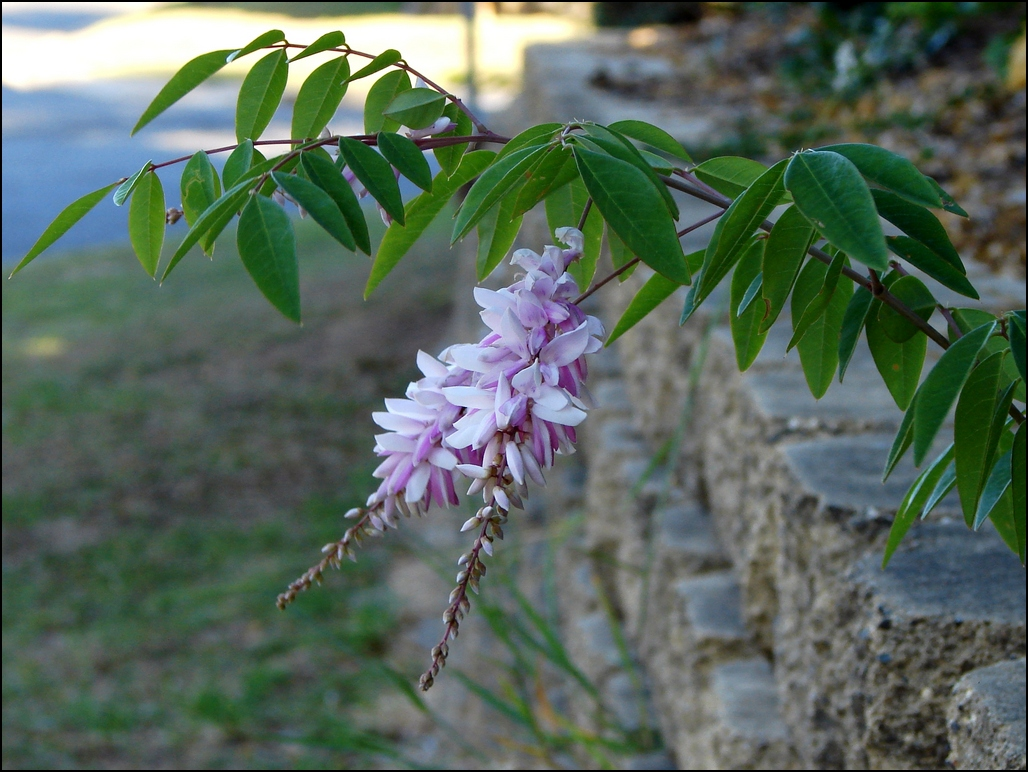
- Summer wisteria

Scientific classification
- Kingdom: Plantae
- Clade: Tracheophytes
- Clade: Angiosperms
- Clade: Eudicots
- Clade: Rosids
- Order: Fabales
- Family: Fabaceae
- Subfamily: Faboideae
- Genus: Indigofera
- Species: I. decora

Binomial name
- Indigofera decora Lindl.
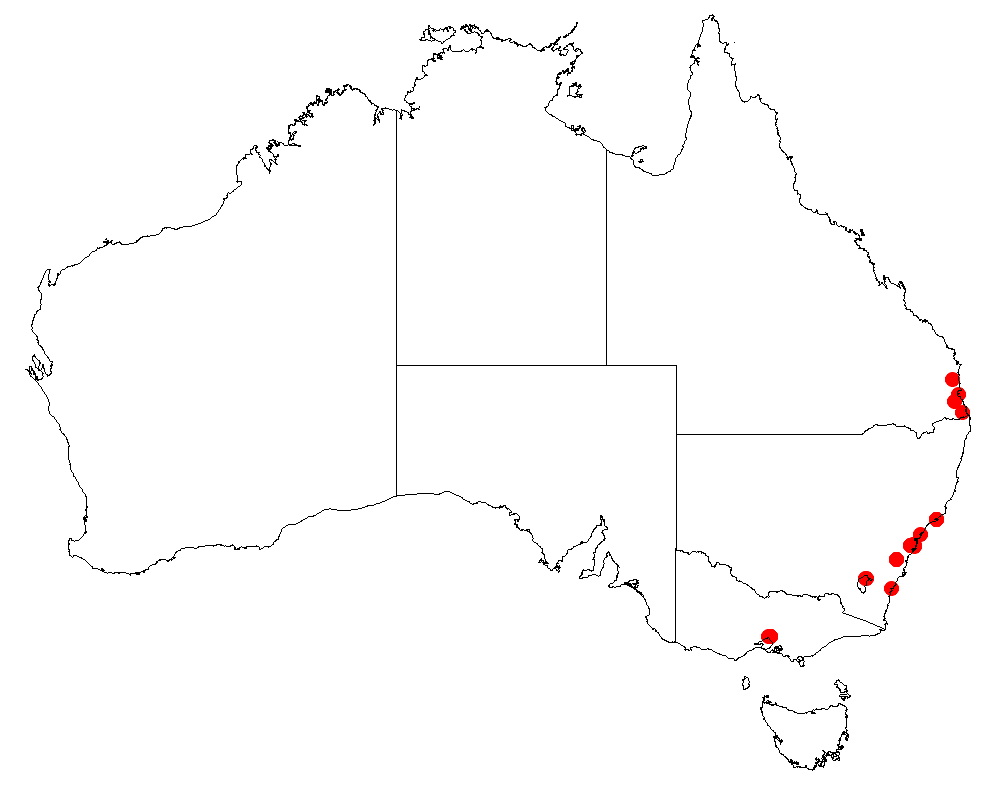
- Distribution in Australia

Synonyms
- Indigofera incarnata (Willd.) Nakai

= Indigofera decora =

Species of legume

Indigofera decora, commonly known as summer wisteria, is a species of shrub native to China and Japan that has since been introduced to Australia and Sri Lanka. A member of the genus Indigofera, its family is Fabaceae and is used primarily for decorative purposes, though it has also been used to make indigo-colored dye.

I. decora is a deciduous, spreading shrub. It often grows 1–2.5 feet tall and 3-4 feet wide. It features compound, pinnate leaves up to 8 inches long with 7-13 elliptic, dark green leaflets. In the summer, it produces axillary racemes of light pink or purple pea-like flowers. Each raceme may boast twenty to forty flowers, and the calyxes have broadly triangular lobes.

I. decora is best suited to well-drained, neutral to slightly alkaline soils. It is somewhat heat and drought tolerant, but benefits from afternoon shade in hot, humid environments. It is cold hardy in the US in zones 7–11.

== Varieties ==
There are three recognised varieties of Indigofera decora:

- Indigofera decora var. chalara (Craib) Y.Y.Fang & C.Z.Zheng
- Indigofera decora var. cooperi (Craib) Y.Y.Fang & C.Z.Zheng
- Indigofera decora var. ichangensis (Craib) Y.Y.Fang & C.Z.Zheng
