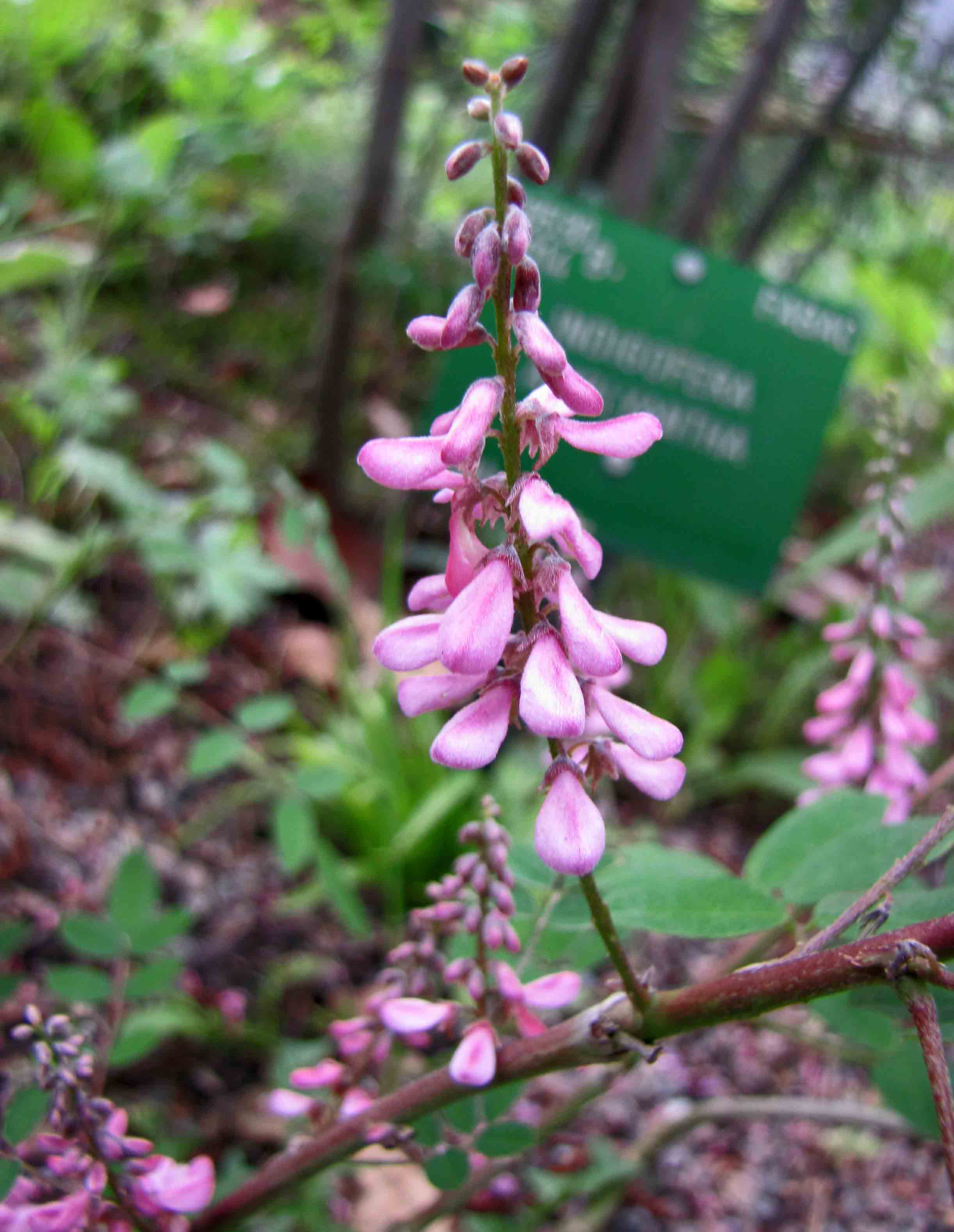
- At the University of Copenhagen Botanical Garden
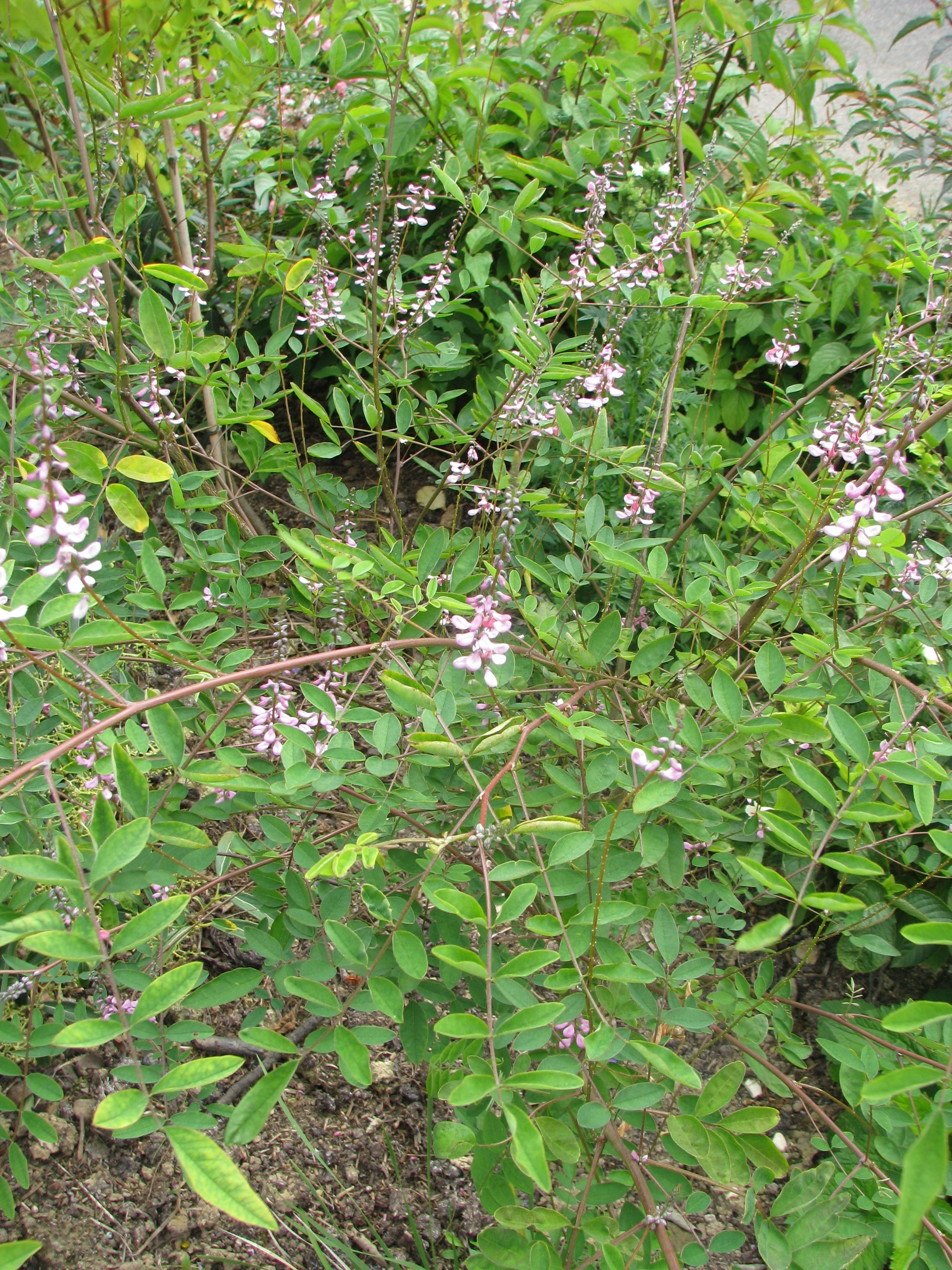
- Habit

Scientific classification
- Kingdom: Plantae
- Clade: Tracheophytes
- Clade: Angiosperms
- Clade: Eudicots
- Clade: Rosids
- Order: Fabales
- Family: Fabaceae
- Subfamily: Faboideae
- Genus: Indigofera
- Species: I. amblyantha

Binomial name
- Indigofera amblyantha Craib

Synonyms
- Indigofera amblyantha var. purdomii Rehder

= Indigofera amblyantha =

Species of plant in the legume family

Indigofera amblyantha, the Chinese indigo or pink-flowered indigo, is a species of flowering plant in the family Fabaceae, native to central and southern China. A non‑climbing shrub reaching 6 ft (2 m), it blooms from May to September, and is recommended for hedges, borders, massing, and containers.
