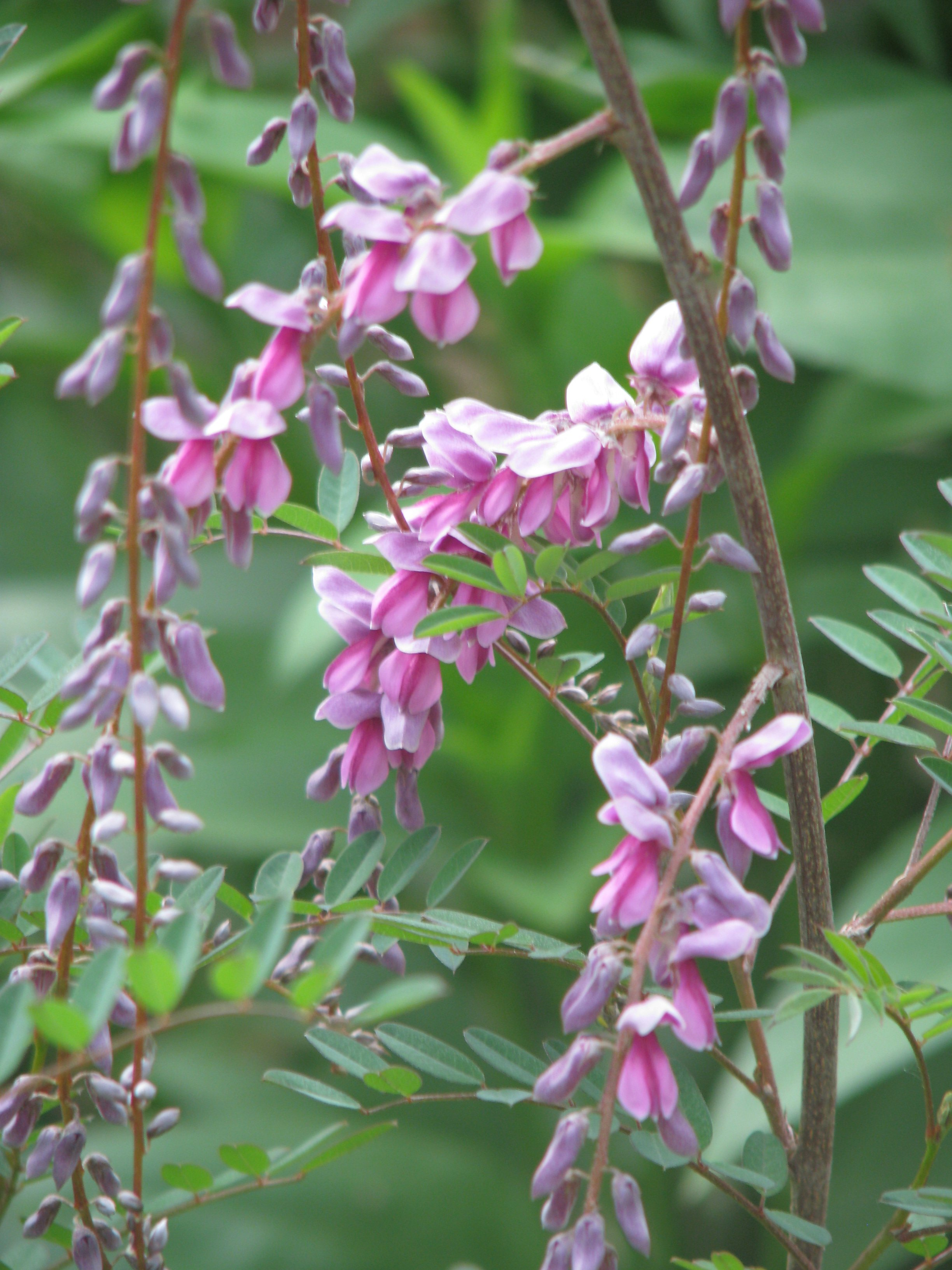
- Flowers and foliage
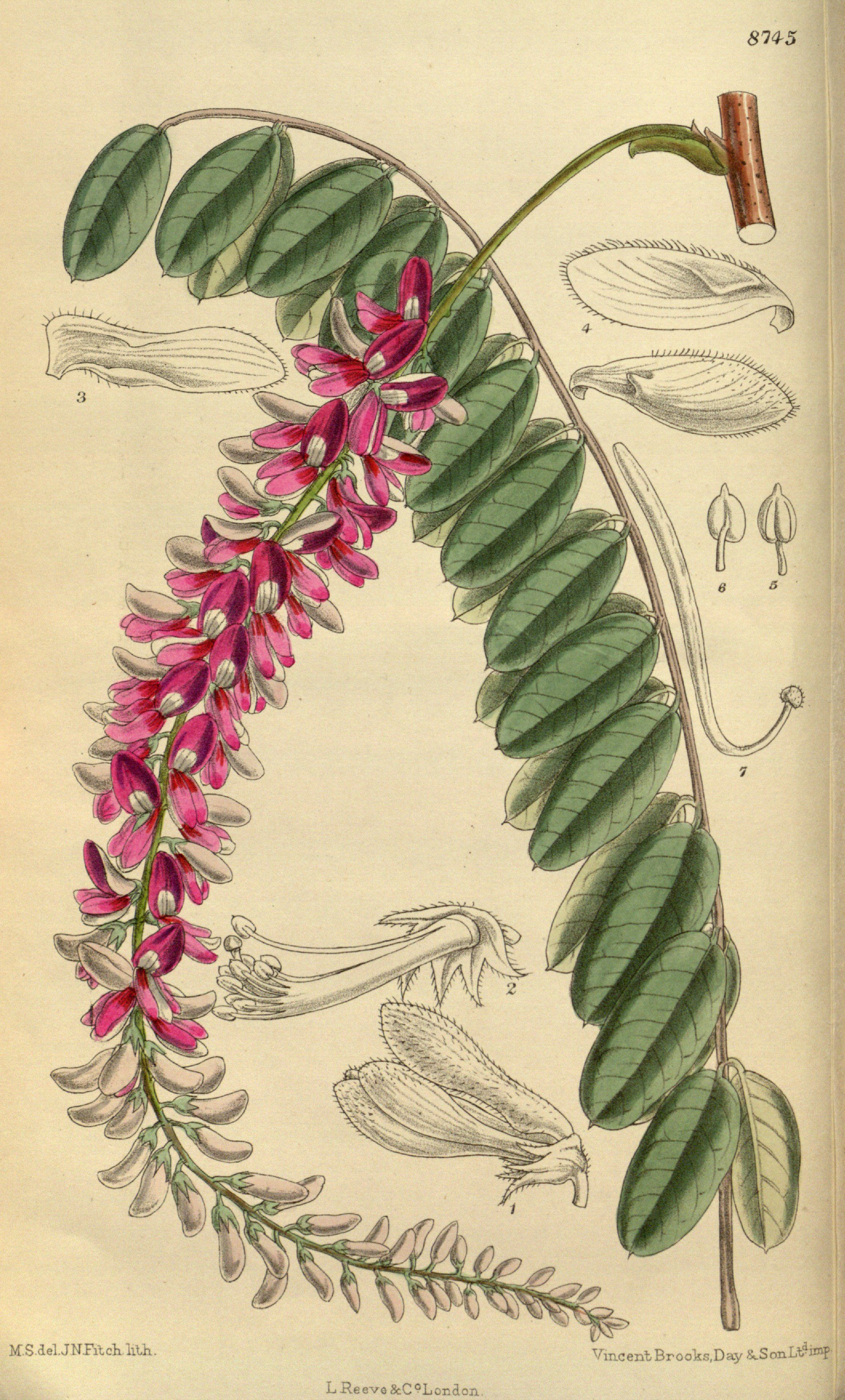
- Botanical illustration

Scientific classification
- Kingdom: Plantae
- Clade: Tracheophytes
- Clade: Angiosperms
- Clade: Eudicots
- Clade: Rosids
- Order: Fabales
- Family: Fabaceae
- Subfamily: Faboideae
- Genus: Indigofera
- Species: I. pendula

Binomial name
- Indigofera pendula Franch.

Synonyms
- List: Indigofera pendula var. angustifolia Y.Y.Fang & C.Z.Zheng; Indigofera pendula var. macrophylla Y.Y.Fang & C.Z.Zheng; Indigofera pendula var. pubescens Y.Y.Fang & C.Z.Zheng; Indigofera pendula var. umbrosa (Craib) Y.Y.Fang & C.Z.Zheng

= Indigofera pendula =

Species of plant in the legume family

Indigofera pendula, the weeping indigo, is a species of flowering plant in the family Fabaceae, native to south-central China. Its cultivar 'Shangri-la' has gained the Royal Horticultural Society's Award of Garden Merit.
