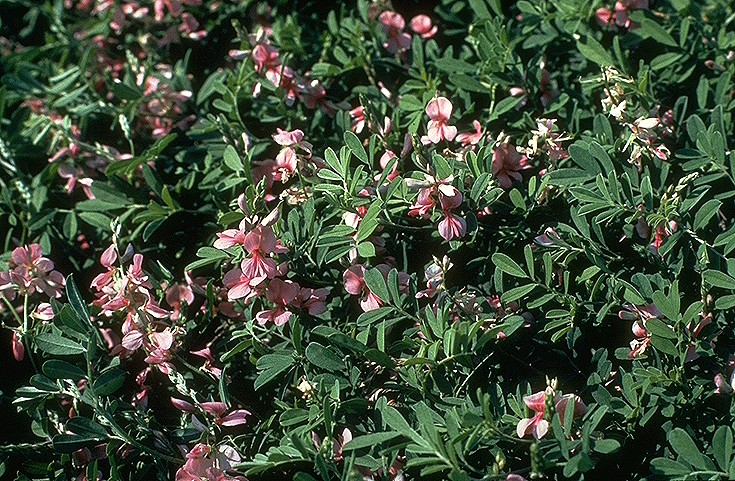
- In bloom

Conservation status
- Least Concern (IUCN 3.1)

Scientific classification
- Kingdom: Plantae
- Clade: Tracheophytes
- Clade: Angiosperms
- Clade: Eudicots
- Clade: Rosids
- Order: Fabales
- Family: Fabaceae
- Subfamily: Faboideae
- Genus: Indigofera
- Species: I. miniata

Binomial name
- Indigofera miniata Ortega

Synonyms
- List: Anil acutifolia (Schltdl.) Kuntze; Anil leptosepala (Nutt.) Kuntze; Anil ornithopodioides Kuntze; Indigofera acutifolia Schltdl.; Indigofera argentata Rydb.; Indigofera brevipes (S.Watson) Rydb.; Indigofera cinerea Buckley; Indigofera cubensis Urb.; Indigofera hartwegii Rydb.; Indigofera leptosepala Nutt.; Indigofera leptosepala var. angustata S.Watson; Indigofera leptosepala var. brevipes S.Watson; Indigofera mexicana Benth.; Indigofera miniata var. florida Isely; Indigofera miniata var. leptosepala (Nutt.) B.L.Turner; Indigofera miniata var. texana (Buckley) B.L.Turner; Indigofera nana Rydb.; Indigofera ornithopodioides Schltdl. & Cham.; Indigofera sphenoides Rydb.; Indigofera texana Buckley; Indigofera tinctaria Hook.

= Indigofera miniata =

Species of plant

Indigofera miniata, the scarlet pea or coastal indigo, is a species of flowering plant in the family Fabaceae, native to the US states of Kansas, Oklahoma, Texas, Alabama, and Florida, and to Mexico, Guatemala, and Cuba. It is a prostrate perennial with stems that are about 60 cm (2 ft) long, and salmon pink flowers.
