= Indigofera howellii =

Scientific classification
- Kingdom: Plantae
- Clade: Tracheophytes
- Clade: Angiosperms
- Clade: Eudicots
- Clade: Rosids
- Order: Fabales
- Family: Fabaceae
- Subfamily: Faboideae
- Genus: Indigofera
- Species: I. howellii

Binomial name
- Indigofera howellii Craib & W.W.Sm.

Synonyms
- Indigofera deqinensis Sanjappa; Indigofera emarginata Y.Y.Fang & C.Z.Zheng

Species of flowering plant

Indigofera howellii is a species of flowering plant in the family Fabaceae, native to south-central China, Tibet, and Myanmar. Its cultivar 'Reginald Cory' has gained the Royal Horticultural Society's Award of Garden Merit. The species is named in honour of Edward Butts Howell.
