= Indigofera ammobia =

Conservation status
- Priority Three — Poorly Known Taxa (DEC)

Scientific classification
- Kingdom: Plantae
- Clade: Tracheophytes
- Clade: Angiosperms
- Clade: Eudicots
- Clade: Rosids
- Order: Fabales
- Family: Fabaceae
- Subfamily: Faboideae
- Genus: Indigofera
- Species: I. ammobia

Binomial name
- Indigofera ammobia Maconochie

Species of plant

Indigofera ammobia is a species of flowering plant in the family Fabaceae, and is endemic to the north-west of Australia. It is an erect, annual or short-lived perennial herb with many stems, terete, hairy young stems, simple, hairy, linear leaves and pink to purple pea-like flowers and ascending to terete, brown pods.

== Description ==
Indigofera ammobia is an erect, annual or short-lived perennial herb that typically grows to a height of 15–70 cm (5.9–27.6 in) and has a taproot and hairy young stems with moderately dense hairs pressed against the surface. Its leaves are simple, linear, mostly 20–45 mm (0.79–1.77 in) long and 0.3–1 mm (0.012–0.039 in) wide on a petiole 0.5–1 mm (0.020–0.039 in) long with stipules 0.3–1 mm (0.012–0.039 in) long at the base. The flowers are pink to purple and borne in racemes of five to seven 15–35 mm (0.59–1.38 in) long in leaf axils and usually shorter than the leaves. Each flower is on a peduncle 3–15 mm (0.12–0.59 in) long with bracts 0.5–0.7 mm (0.020–0.028 in) long. The sepals are about 1.5 mm (0.059 in) long with lobes equal to or longer than the length of the tube, and with moderately dense grey hairs. The standard petal is pink, egg-shaped to round, 3.0–3.2 mm (0.12–0.13 in) high and 2.8–3.0 mm (0.11–0.12 in) wide, the wings spatula-shaped to narrowly egg-shaped 2.9–3.3 mm (0.11–0.13 in) long and 1.1–1.3 mm (0.043–0.051 in) wide, and the keel is 3.3–3.5 mm (0.13–0.14 in) long and 1.3–1.5 mm (0.051–0.059 in) deep. Flowering has been observed in September, and the pods are ascending to spreading, 15–30 mm (0.59–1.18 in) long and 2–3 mm (0.079–0.118 in) deep with 5 to 10 seeds in each.

== Taxonomy ==
Indigofera ammobia was first formally described in 1980 by John Richard Maconochie and the description was published in the Journal of the Adelaide Botanic Gardens from specimens collected by Alex George north of the Dragon Tree Soak in the Great Sandy Desert in 1977. The specific epithet (ammobia) means 'in sand'.

== Distribution and habitat ==
This species of indigofera grows in red sand on dunes and sandplains in the Central Kimberley, Dampierland, Great Sandy Desert, Ord Victoria Plain and Pilbara bioregions of Western Australia and the Arnhem Plateau and Pine Creek bioregions of the Northern Territory.

== Conservation status ==
Indigofera ammobia is listed as 'Priority Three' by the Government of Western Australia Department of Biodiversity, Conservation and Attractions, meaning that it is poorly known and known from only a few locations but is not under imminent threat.

== See also ==
- List of Indigofera species
