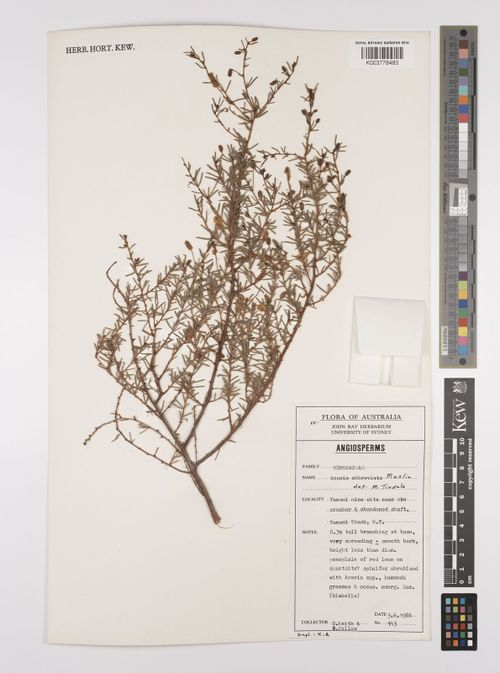
- Specimen collected on the Tanami Track

Scientific classification
- Kingdom: Plantae
- Clade: Tracheophytes
- Clade: Angiosperms
- Clade: Eudicots
- Clade: Rosids
- Order: Fabales
- Family: Fabaceae
- Subfamily: Caesalpinioideae
- Clade: Mimosoid clade
- Genus: Acacia
- Species: A. abbreviata

Binomial name
- Acacia abbreviata Maslin
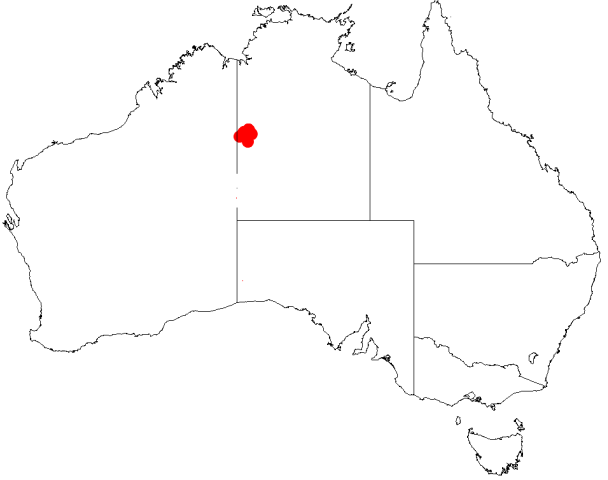
- Occurrence data from Australasian Virtual Herbarium

Synonyms
- Racosperma abbreviatum (Maslin) Pedley

= Acacia abbreviata =

Species of legume

Acacia abbreviata is a species of flowering plant in the family Fabaceae and is endemic to arid parts of northern Australia. It is a spreading, glabrous, resinous shrub with linear to narrowly oblong phyllodes, spike of golden flowers, and linear to lance-shaped pods.

== Description ==
The resinous shrub has a spreading habit and typically grows to a height of 0.3 to 0.6 m (1 ft 0 in to 2 ft 0 in) with a width of 1 to 3.6 m (3 ft 3 in to 11 ft 10 in). The generally smooth pale grey-brown coloured bark is minutely fissured. The angular yellow to red-brown branchlets have small resinous hairs and obscure ridges. The linear green phyllodes occur in groups of six at the nodes. They have a narrowly oblong or narrowly oblanceolate shape and a length of 0.4 to 2.5 cm (0.16 to 0.98 in) and a width of 0.6 to 1.2 mm (0.024 to 0.047 in) with indistinct nerves. It blooms between April and October producing cylindrical flower-spikes with a length of 0.7 to 2 cm (0.28 to 0.79 in) packed with golden coloured flowers. The flat and sub-woody seed pods that form after flowering have a linear-oblanceolate shape that tapers toward the base. The pods are 2.5 to 6.5 cm (0.98 to 2.56 in) in length and 3 to 5 mm (0.12 to 0.20 in) wide, have prominent margins and open elastically from the apex. The seeds inside are arranged obliquely to longitudinally. The brown seeds have a narrowly oblong shape and a length of 3 to 4.5 mm (0.12 to 0.18 in) and have a narrowly turbinate aril.

== Taxonomy ==
Acacia abbreviata was first formally described in 1980 by the botanist Bruce Maslin in the Journal of the Adelaide Botanic Gardens from a specimen collected by John Richard Maconochie (as Acacia amentifera) in the Tanami Desert in 1970. It was reclassified as Racosperma abbreviatum in 2003 by Leslie Pedley in the journal Austrobaileya, then transferred back to genus Acacia in 2006. The specific epithet (abbreviata) means "shortened", referring to the very short phyllodes.

== Distribution ==
The shrub is found in a small area of the Tanami Desert in the Northern Territory close to the Western Australian border. It usually grows on stony lateritic ridges and plains where it grows in shallow clay loamy soils as a part of spinifex communities.

== See also ==
- List of Acacia species
