= List of Indigofera species =

Indigofera is a genus of flowering plants in the family Fabaceae. As of April 2025, Plants of the World Online accepted the following species.

== A ==
- Indigofera abbottii Schrire & K.W.Grieve
- Indigofera acanthinocarpa Blatt.
- Indigofera acanthoclada Dinter
- Indigofera achyranthoides Taub.
- Indigofera acutipetala Y.Y.Fang & C.Z.Zheng
- Indigofera acutisepala Conrath ex Baker f.
- Indigofera adenocarpa E.Mey.
- Indigofera adenoides Baker f.
- Indigofera adenotricha Peter G.Wilson
- Indigofera adesmiifolia A.Gray – tick indigo (Qld, N.S.W., Vic., A.C.T.)
- Indigofera alopecuroides DC.
- Indigofera alpina Eckl. & Zeyh.
- Indigofera alternans DC.
- Indigofera ambelacensis Schweinf.
- Indigofera amblyantha Craib – pink-flowered indigo (China)
- Indigofera amitina N.E.Br.
- Indigofera ammobia Maconochie (W.A.)
- Indigofera ammoxylon (DC.) Polhill
- Indigofera amoena Aiton
- Indigofera amorphoides Jaub. & Spach
- Indigofera anabibensis A.Schreib.
- Indigofera ancistrocarpa Thulin
- Indigofera andrewsiana J.B.Gillett
- Indigofera andringitrensis R.Vig.
- Indigofera angulosa Edgew.
- Indigofera angustata E.Mey.
- Indigofera ankaratrensis R.Vig.
- Indigofera antunesiana Harms
- Indigofera arabica Jaub. & Spach
- Indigofera aralensis Gagnep.
- Indigofera arenophila Schinz
- Indigofera argentea Burm.f.
- Indigofera argutidens Craib
- Indigofera arnottii (Kuntze) Peter G.Wilson
- Indigofera arrecta Hochst. ex A.Rich.
- Indigofera articulata Gouan
- Indigofera asantasanensis Schrire & V.R.Clark
- Indigofera aspalathoides Vahl ex DC.
- Indigofera aspera Perr. ex DC.
- Indigofera asperifolia Bong. ex Benth.
- Indigofera asterocalycina Gilli
- Indigofera astragalina DC.
- Indigofera astragaloides Welw. ex Romariz
- Indigofera atrata N.E.Br.
- Indigofera atricephala J.B.Gillett
- Indigofera atriceps Hook.f.
- Indigofera atropurpurea Buch.-Ham. ex Hornem.
- Indigofera auricoma E.Mey.
- Indigofera australis Willd. – Australian indigo, Austral indigo, native indigo, hill indigo (Australia)

== B ==
- Indigofera baileyi F.Muell.
- Indigofera bainesii Baker
- Indigofera balfouriana Craib
- Indigofera bancroftii Peter G.Wilson
- Indigofera bangweolensis R.E.Fr.
- Indigofera banii N.D.Khôi & Yakovlev
- Indigofera barberi Gamble
- Indigofera barkeri du Preez & Schrire
- Indigofera barotseensis Schrire
- Indigofera barteri Hutch. & Dalziel
- Indigofera basedowii E.Pritz.
- Indigofera basiflora J.B.Gillett
- Indigofera basotha du Preez & Schrire
- Indigofera baumiana Harms
- Indigofera bayensis Thulin
- Indigofera bella Prain
- Indigofera bemarahaensis Du Puy & Labat
- Indigofera benguellensis Baker
- Indigofera berhautiana J.B.Gillett
- Indigofera biglandulosa J.B.Gillett
- Indigofera binderi Kotschy
- Indigofera blaiseae Du Puy & Labat
- Indigofera blanchetiana Benth.
- Indigofera bogdanii J.B.Gillett
- Indigofera boinensis R.Vig.
- Indigofera bojeri Baker
- Indigofera bongardiana (Kuntze) Burkart
- Indigofera bongensis Kotschy & Peyr.
- Indigofera boranica Thulin
- Indigofera bosseri Du Puy & Labat
- Indigofera boviperda Morrison (W.A.)
- Indigofera brachynema J.B.Gillett
- Indigofera brachyphylla Al-Turki
- Indigofera brachystachya E.Mey.
- Indigofera bracteata Graham ex Baker
- Indigofera bracteolata DC.
- Indigofera brassii Baker
- Indigofera brennanii Peter G.Wilson
- Indigofera brevicalyx Baker f.
- Indigofera brevidens Benth.
- Indigofera brevifilamenta J.B.Gillett
- Indigofera breviracemosa Torre
- Indigofera breviviscosa J.B.Gillett
- Indigofera brunoniana Graham ex Wall.
- Indigofera buchananii Burtt Davy
- Indigofera bungeana Walp.
- Indigofera burchellii DC.
- Indigofera burttii Baker f.
- Indigofera bussei J.B.Gillett
- Indigofera byobiensis Hosok.

== C ==
- Indigofera calcarea du Preez & Schrire
- Indigofera calcicola Craib
- Indigofera caloneura Kurz
- Indigofera campestris Bong. ex Benth.
- Indigofera candicans Aiton
- Indigofera candolleana Meisn.
- Indigofera capillaris Thunb.
- Indigofera capitata Kotschy
- Indigofera carlesii Craib
- Indigofera caroliniana Mill.
- Indigofera cassioides Rottler ex DC.
- Indigofera caudata Dunn
- Indigofera cavallii Chiov.
- Indigofera ceciliae N.E.Br.
- Indigofera cedrorum Dunn
- Indigofera centralis Peter G.Wilson & Rowe
- Indigofera cerighellii M.Peltier
- Indigofera chaetodonta Franch.
- Indigofera chamaeclada Peter G.Wilson & Rowe
- Indigofera charlieriana Schinz
- Indigofera chenii S.S.Chien
- Indigofera chevalieri Tisser.
- Indigofera chimanimaniensis Schrire
- Indigofera chirensis Cufod. ex J.B.Gillett
- Indigofera chitralensis Sanjappa
- Indigofera ciferrii Chiov.
- Indigofera cinericolor F.Muell.
- Indigofera circinella Baker f.
- Indigofera circinnata Benth. ex Harv.
- Indigofera cliffordiana J.B.Gillett
- Indigofera cloiselii Drake
- Indigofera coerulea Roxb.
- Indigofera cogmaniana du Preez & Schrire
- Indigofera colutea (Burm.f.) Merr.
- Indigofera commixta N.E.Br.
- Indigofera comosa N.E.Br.
- Indigofera complanata Rchb. ex Spreng.
- Indigofera complicata Eckl. & Zeyh.
- Indigofera compressa Lam.
- Indigofera concava Harv.
- Indigofera concinna Baker
- Indigofera conferta J.B.Gillett
- Indigofera congesta Welw. ex Baker
- Indigofera congolensis De Wild. & T.Durand
- Indigofera conjugata Baker
- Indigofera constricta (Thwaites) Trimen
- Indigofera conzattii Rose
- Indigofera corallinosperma Torre
- Indigofera cordifolia B.Heyne ex Roth
- Indigofera corniculata E.Mey.
- Indigofera cornuligera Peter G.Wilson & Rowe
- Indigofera coronillifolia A.Cunn. ex Benth.
- Indigofera coronilloides M.Martens & Galeotti
- Indigofera costaricensis Benth.
- Indigofera crebra N.E.Br.
- Indigofera crotalarioides (Klotzsch) Baker
- Indigofera cryptantha Benth. ex Harv.
- Indigofera cuernavacana Rose
- Indigofera cuitoensis Baker f.
- Indigofera cuneata Baker
- Indigofera cuneifolia Eckl. & Zeyh.
- Indigofera cunenensis Torre
- Indigofera curvata J.B.Gillett
- Indigofera curvirostrata Thulin
- Indigofera cuspidata Peter G.Wilson & Rowe
- Indigofera cylindracea Graham ex Baker
- Indigofera cytisoides (L.) L.

== D ==
- Indigofera daleoides Benth. ex Harv.
- Indigofera dalzelliana (Kuntze) Peter G.Wilson
- Indigofera damarana Merxm. & A.Schreib.
- Indigofera dasyantha Baker f.
- Indigofera dasycephala Baker f.
- Indigofera dauensis J.B.Gillett
- Indigofera deccanensis Sanjappa
- Indigofera decipiens Peter G.Wilson & Rowe
- Indigofera declinata E.Mey.
- Indigofera decora Lindl.
- Indigofera deflersii Baker f.
- Indigofera deightonii J.B.Gillett
- Indigofera dekindtii Tisser.
- Indigofera delagoaensis Baker f. ex J.B.Gillett
- Indigofera delavayi Franch.
- Indigofera dembianensis (Chiov.) J.B.Gillett
- Indigofera demissa Taub.
- Indigofera dendroides Jacq.
- Indigofera densa N.E.Br.
- Indigofera densiflora M.Martens & Galeotti
- Indigofera densifructa Y.Y.Fang & C.Z.Zheng
- Indigofera denudata L.f.
- Indigofera depauperata Drake
- Indigofera deserticola Peter G.Wilson & Rowe
- Indigofera desertorum Torre
- Indigofera dichroa Craib
- Indigofera digitata L.f.
- Indigofera dillwynioides Benth. ex Harv.
- Indigofera dimidiata Vogel ex Walp.
- Indigofera dionaeifolia (S.Moore) Schrire
- Indigofera diphylla Vent.
- Indigofera discolor E.Mey.
- Indigofera dissitiflora Baker
- Indigofera disticha Eckl. & Zeyh.
- Indigofera diversifolia DC.
- Indigofera dodii du Preez & Schrire
- Indigofera dolichochaete Craib
- Indigofera dosua Buch.-Ham. ex D.Don
- Indigofera dregeana E.Mey.
- Indigofera drepanocarpa Taub.
- Indigofera dumbeana M.Pignal & L.P.Queiroz
- Indigofera dumetorum Craib
- Indigofera dumosa E.Mey.
- Indigofera dyeri Britten

== E ==
- Indigofera edwardi Govaerts
- Indigofera efoliata F.Muell.
- Indigofera egens N.E.Br.
- Indigofera elachantha Peter G.Wilson & Rowe
- Indigofera elandsbergensis Phillipson
- Indigofera ellenbeckii Baker f.
- Indigofera elliotii (Baker f.) J.B.Gillett
- Indigofera elwakensis J.B.Gillett
- Indigofera emarginella Steud. ex A.Rich.
- Indigofera emarginelloides J.B.Gillett
- Indigofera emmae de Kort & G.Thijsse
- Indigofera enormis N.E.Br.
- Indigofera equimontana du Preez & Schrire
- Indigofera erecta Thunb.
- Indigofera eremophila Thulin
- Indigofera eriocarpa E.Mey.
- Indigofera eriophylla Peter G.Wilson & Rowe
- Indigofera ernstii du Preez & Schrire
- Indigofera erubescens Peter G.Wilson & Rowe
- Indigofera erythrogramma Welw. ex Baker
- Indigofera esquirolii H.Lév.
- Indigofera evansiana Burtt Davy
- Indigofera evansii Schltr.
- Indigofera ewartiana Domin
- Indigofera exellii Torre
- Indigofera exigua Eckl. & Zeyh.
- Indigofera exilis Grierson & D.G.Long
- Indigofera eylesiana J.B.Gillett

== F ==
- Indigofera fanshawei J.B.Gillett
- Indigofera faulknerae J.B.Gillett
- Indigofera filicaulis Eckl. & Zeyh.
- Indigofera filifolia Thunb.
- Indigofera filiformis Thunb.
- Indigofera filipes Benth. ex Harv.
- Indigofera fimbriolata Peter G.Wilson
- Indigofera flabellata Harv.
- Indigofera flavicans Baker
- Indigofera fleckii Baker f.
- Indigofera floresii Cruz Durán & M.Sousa
- Indigofera floribunda N.E.Br.
- Indigofera foliosa E.Mey.
- Indigofera fortunei Craib
- Indigofera fractiflexa Peter G.Wilson & Rowe
- Indigofera franchetii X.F.Gao & Schrire
- Indigofera frondosa N.E.Br.
- Indigofera frutescens L.f.
- Indigofera fruticosa Rose
- Indigofera fulcrata Harv.
- Indigofera fulgens Baker
- Indigofera fulvopilosa Brenan
- Indigofera fuscobarbata Schrire
- Indigofera fuscosetosa Baker

== G ==
- Indigofera gairdnerae Hutch. ex Baker f.
- Indigofera galegoides DC.
- Indigofera galpinii N.E.Br.
- Indigofera gangetica Sanjappa
- Indigofera garckeana Vatke
- Indigofera gariepensis du Preez & Schrire
- Indigofera geminata Baker
- Indigofera georgei E.Pritz.
- Indigofera gerrardiana Harv.
- Indigofera giessii A.Schreib.
- Indigofera gifbergensis C.H.Stirt. & Jarvie
- Indigofera gilesii Peter G.Wilson & Rowe
- Indigofera glabra L.
- Indigofera glandulosa J.C.Wendl.
- Indigofera glaucescens Eckl. & Zeyh.
- Indigofera glaucifolia Cronquist
- Indigofera glomerata E.Mey.
- Indigofera gloriosa Cronquist
- Indigofera gobensis Schrire
- Indigofera goetzei Harms
- Indigofera gracilis Spreng.
- Indigofera grandiflora B.H.Choi & S.K.Cho
- Indigofera graniticola J.B.Gillett
- Indigofera grata E.Mey.
- Indigofera griseoides Harms
- Indigofera grisophylla Fourc.
- Indigofera guaranitica Hassl.
- Indigofera guthriei Bolus
- Indigofera gypsacea Thulin

== H ==
- Indigofera haematica Peter G.Wilson
- Indigofera hamulosa Schltr.
- Indigofera hancockii Craib
- Indigofera hantamensis Diels
- Indigofera haplophylla F.Muell.
- Indigofera hebepetala Benth. ex Baker
- Indigofera hedyantha Eckl. & Zeyh.
- Indigofera helmsii Peter G.Wilson
- Indigofera hendecaphylla Jacq.
- Indigofera henryi Craib
- Indigofera hermannioides J.B.Gillett
- Indigofera herrstreyi Schrire & K.W.Grieve
- Indigofera heterantha Wall. ex Brandis
- Indigofera heterocarpa Welw. ex Baker
- Indigofera heterophylla Thunb.
- Indigofera heterotricha DC.
- Indigofera heudelotii Benth. ex Baker
- Indigofera hewittii Baker f.
- Indigofera hilaris Eckl. & Zeyh.
- Indigofera hillburttii Schrire & K.W.Grieve
- Indigofera himachalensis V.Chauhan & A.K.Pandey
- Indigofera himalayensis Ali
- Indigofera hiranensis Thulin
- Indigofera hirsuta L.
- Indigofera hirsutissima M.Sousa & Cruz Durán
- Indigofera hispida Eckl. & Zeyh.
- Indigofera hochstetteri Baker
- Indigofera hofmanniana Schinz
- Indigofera hololeuca Benth. ex Harv.
- Indigofera holubii N.E.Br.
- Indigofera homblei Baker f. & Martin
- Indigofera hopingensis S.S.Ying
- Indigofera howellii Craib & W.W.Sm.
- Indigofera huillensis Baker f.
- Indigofera humbertiana M.Peltier
- Indigofera humifusa Eckl. & Zeyh.
- Indigofera humilis Kunth
- Indigofera hundtii Rossbach
- Indigofera huntleyi Schrire & K.W.Grieve
- Indigofera hybrida N.E.Br.
- Indigofera hydra Schrire & K.W.Grieve
- Indigofera hygrobia Malme

== I–J ==
- Indigofera imerinensis Du Puy & Labat
- Indigofera incana Thunb.
- Indigofera incompta McVaugh
- Indigofera ingrata N.E.Br.
- Indigofera inhambanensis Klotzsch
- Indigofera intermedia Harv.
- Indigofera interrupta (Du Puy, Labat & Schrire) Schrire
- Indigofera intricata Boiss.
- Indigofera ionii Jarvie & C.H.Stirt.
- Indigofera irodoensis Du Puy & Labat
- Indigofera ischnoclada Harms
- Indigofera itremoensis Du Puy & Labat
- Indigofera ixocarpa Peter G.Wilson & Rowe
- Indigofera jaliscensis Rose
- Indigofera jikongensis Y.Y.Fang & C.Z.Zheng
- Indigofera jindongensis Y.Y.Fang & C.Z.Zheng
- Indigofera jintongpenensis Huan C.Wang, L.Yao & X.L.Zhao
- Indigofera jucunda Schrire

== K ==
- Indigofera kaessneri Baker f.
- Indigofera karkarensis Thulin
- Indigofera kavangoensis Schrire
- Indigofera kelleri Baker f.
- Indigofera kerrii de Kort & G.Thijsse
- Indigofera kerstingii Harms
- Indigofera kingiana Peter G.Wilson & Rowe
- Indigofera kirilowii Maxim. ex Palibin
- Indigofera kirkii Oliv.
- Indigofera kongwaensis J.B.Gillett
- Indigofera koreana Ohwi
- Indigofera krookii Schltr. ex Zahlbr.
- Indigofera kuntzei Harms
- Indigofera kurtzii Harms

== L ==
- Indigofera lacei Craib
- Indigofera lancifolia Rydb.
- Indigofera langebergensis L.Bolus
- Indigofera langlassei Rydb.
- Indigofera lasiantha Desv.
- Indigofera latifolia Micheli
- Indigofera latisepala J.B.Gillett
- Indigofera laxeracemosa Baker f.
- Indigofera laxiflora Craib
- Indigofera leendertziae N.E.Br.
- Indigofera lenticellata Craib
- Indigofera lepida N.E.Br.
- Indigofera leprieurii (Kuntze) Baker f.
- Indigofera leptocarpa Eckl. & Zeyh.
- Indigofera leptoclada Harms
- Indigofera lespedezioides Kunth
- Indigofera letestui Tisser.
- Indigofera leucoclada Baker
- Indigofera leucotricha E.Pritz.
- Indigofera lidaoana S.S.Ying
- Indigofera limosa L.Bolus
- Indigofera lindheimeriana Scheele
- Indigofera linifolia (L.f.) Retz.
- Indigofera litoralis Chun & H.Y.Chen
- Indigofera livingstoniana J.B.Gillett
- Indigofera longebarbata Engl.
- Indigofera longibractea J.M.Black
- Indigofera longicauda Thuan
- Indigofera longidentata (Du Puy, Labat & Schrire) Schrire
- Indigofera longimucronata Baker f.
- Indigofera longipedicellata J.B.Gillett
- Indigofera longiracemosa Boivin ex Baill.
- Indigofera longistaminata Schrire
- Indigofera lotononoides Baker f.
- Indigofera lughensis Thulin
- Indigofera lupatana Baker f.
- Indigofera luzonensis de Kort & G.Thijsse
- Indigofera lyallii Baker
- Indigofera lydenburgensis N.E.Br.

== M ==
- Indigofera macrantha Harms
- Indigofera macrocalyx Guill. & Perr.
- Indigofera macrophylla Schumach.
- Indigofera magallanesii Cruz Durán & M.Sousa
- Indigofera magnifica Schrire & V.R.Clark
- Indigofera mahafalensis (Du Puy, Labat & Schrire) Schrire
- Indigofera mairei Pamp.
- Indigofera malacostachys Benth.
- Indigofera malindiensis J.B.Gillett
- Indigofera malongensis Cronquist
- Indigofera mangokyensis R.Vig.
- Indigofera manyoniensis Baker f.
- Indigofera mariosousae Rzed. & R.Grether
- Indigofera maritima Baker
- Indigofera marmorata Balf.f.
- Indigofera masaiensis J.B.Gillett
- Indigofera masonae N.E.Br.
- Indigofera matudae Lundell
- Indigofera mauritanica (L.) Thunb.
- Indigofera maymyoensis Sanjappa
- Indigofera megacephala J.B.Gillett
- Indigofera megaphylla X.F.Gao
- Indigofera melanadenia Benth. ex Harv.
- Indigofera melanosticta Peter G.Wilson & Rowe
- Indigofera mendesii Torre
- Indigofera mendoncae J.B.Gillett
- Indigofera mengtzeana Craib
- Indigofera merxmuelleri A.Schreib.
- Indigofera meyeriana Eckl. & Zeyh.
- Indigofera micheliana Rose
- Indigofera microcalyx Baker
- Indigofera microcarpa Desv.
- Indigofera micropetala Baker f.
- Indigofera microscypha Baker
- Indigofera mildbraediana J.B.Gillett
- Indigofera mildrediana Torre
- Indigofera milne-redheadii J.B.Gillett
- Indigofera mimosoides Baker
- Indigofera minbuensis Gage
- Indigofera miniata Ortega
- Indigofera mischocarpa Schltr.
- Indigofera mollicoma N.E.Br.
- Indigofera mollis Eckl. & Zeyh.
- Indigofera monantha Baker f.
- Indigofera monanthoides J.B.Gillett
- Indigofera monieriana M.Pignal & L.P.Queiroz
- Indigofera monophylla DC.
- Indigofera monostachya Eckl. & Zeyh.
- Indigofera montana Rose
- Indigofera mooneyi Thulin
- Indigofera morroensis São Paulo & L.P.Queiroz
- Indigofera mouroundavensis Baill.
- Indigofera muliensis Y.Y.Fang & C.Z.Zheng
- Indigofera mundiana Eckl. & Zeyh.
- Indigofera mupensis Torre
- Indigofera mwanzae J.B.Gillett
- Indigofera myosurus Craib
- Indigofera mysorensis Rottler ex DC.

== N ==
- Indigofera nairobiensis Baker f.
- Indigofera nambalensis Harms
- Indigofera namuliensis Schrire
- Indigofera natalensis Bolus
- Indigofera nebrowniana J.B.Gillett
- Indigofera neglecta N.E.Br.
- Indigofera nelsonii Rydb.
- Indigofera neosericopetala P.C.Li
- Indigofera nephrocarpa Balf.f.
- Indigofera nephrocarpoides J.B.Gillett
- Indigofera ngwenyana Schrire & K.W.Grieve
- Indigofera nigrescens Kurz ex King & Prain
- Indigofera nigricans Vahl ex Pers.
- Indigofera nigritana Hook.f.
- Indigofera nigromontana Eckl. & Zeyh.
- Indigofera nudicaulis E.Mey.
- Indigofera nugalensis Thulin
- Indigofera nummularia Welw. ex Baker
- Indigofera nummulariifolia (L.) Livera ex Alston
- Indigofera nyassica Gilli

== O ==
- Indigofera obcordata Eckl. & Zeyh.
- Indigofera oblongifolia Forssk.
- Indigofera obscura N.E.Br.
- Indigofera occidentalis Peter G.Wilson & Rowe
- Indigofera ogadensis J.B.Gillett
- Indigofera oligophylla Klotzsch
- Indigofera omariana J.B.Gillett
- Indigofera omissa J.B.Gillett
- Indigofera oraria Peter G.Wilson & Rowe
- Indigofera ormocarpoides Baker
- Indigofera oubanguiensis Tisser.
- Indigofera outeniquensis du Preez & Schrire
- Indigofera outrampsii du Preez & Schrire
- Indigofera ovata Thunb.
- Indigofera ovina Harv.
- Indigofera oxalidea Welw. ex Baker
- Indigofera oxyrachis Peter G.Wilson
- Indigofera oxytropis Benth. ex Harv.

== P–Q ==
- Indigofera palmeri S.Watson
- Indigofera pampaniniana Craib
- Indigofera panamensis Rydb.
- Indigofera paniculata Vahl ex Pers.
- Indigofera pappei Fourc.
- Indigofera paracapitata J.B.Gillett
- Indigofera paraglaucifolia Torre
- Indigofera paraoxalidea Torre
- Indigofera parkesii Craib
- Indigofera parodiana Burkart
- Indigofera patula Baker
- Indigofera pauciflora Eckl. & Zeyh.
- Indigofera paucifolioides Blatt. & Hallb.
- Indigofera paucistrigosa J.B.Gillett
- Indigofera pearsonii Baker f.
- Indigofera pedicellata Wight & Arn.
- Indigofera pedunculata Hils. & Bojer ex Baker
- Indigofera pellucida J.B.Gillett & Thulin
- Indigofera peltata J.B.Gillett
- Indigofera peltieri Du Puy & Labat
- Indigofera pendula Franch.
- Indigofera penduloides Y.Y.Fang & C.Z.Zheng
- Indigofera perrieri R.Vig.
- Indigofera petiolata Cronquist
- Indigofera petraea Peter G.Wilson & Rowe
- Indigofera phyllanthoides Baker
- Indigofera phymatodea Thulin
- Indigofera pilgeriana Schltr. ex du Preez & Schrire
- Indigofera pilifera Peter G.Wilson & Rowe
- Indigofera pilosa Poir.
- Indigofera pinifolia Baker
- Indigofera pinnata (Burm.f.) J.F.B.Pastore & Agust.Martinez
- Indigofera placida N.E.Br.
- Indigofera platycarpa Rose
- Indigofera platypoda E.Mey.
- Indigofera platyspira J.B.Gillett ex Thulin & M.G.Gilbert
- Indigofera pobeguinii J.B.Gillett
- Indigofera podocarpa Baker f. & Martin
- Indigofera podophylla Benth. ex Harv.
- Indigofera poliotes Eckl. & Zeyh.
- Indigofera polyclada Peter G.Wilson & Rowe
- Indigofera polygaloides M.B.Scott
- Indigofera polysphaera Baker
- Indigofera pondoensis Baker f. ex Schrire & K.W.Grieve
- Indigofera pongolana N.E.Br.
- Indigofera porrecta Eckl. & Zeyh.
- Indigofera potbergensis du Preez & Schrire
- Indigofera pratensis F.Muell.
- Indigofera praticola Baker f.
- Indigofera pretoriana Harms
- Indigofera prieureana Guill. & Perr.
- Indigofera priorii Govaerts
- Indigofera procumbens L.
- Indigofera prostrata Willd.
- Indigofera pruinosa Welw. ex Baker
- Indigofera psammophila Peter G.Wilson
- Indigofera pseudocompressa (Du Puy, Labat & Schrire) Schrire
- Indigofera pseudodemissa Schrire
- Indigofera pseudodyeri Schrire
- Indigofera pseudoevansii Hilliard & B.L.Burtt
- Indigofera pseudoheterantha X.F.Gao & Schrire
- Indigofera pseudointricata J.B.Gillett
- Indigofera pseudomoniliformis Schrire
- Indigofera pseudonigrescens X.F.Gao & X.L.Zhao
- Indigofera pseudoparvula R.Vig.
- Indigofera pseudoreticulata Grierson & D.G.Long
- Indigofera pseudosubulata Baker f.
- Indigofera psoraloides (L.) L.
- Indigofera pueblensis Rydb.
- Indigofera pulchra Willd.
- Indigofera punctata Thunb.
- Indigofera pungens E.Mey.
- Indigofera purpusii Brandegee

== Q ==
- Indigofera quarrei Cronquist
- Indigofera queenslandica Peter G.Wilson & Rowe
- Indigofera quinquefolia E.Mey.

== R ==
- Indigofera radicifera Cronquist
- Indigofera ramosissima J.B.Gillett
- Indigofera ramulosissima Hosok.
- Indigofera rautanenii Baker f.
- Indigofera reducta N.E.Br.
- Indigofera rehmannii Baker f.
- Indigofera repens Cronquist
- Indigofera reticulata Franch.
- Indigofera rhodantha Fourc.
- Indigofera rhynchocarpa Welw. ex Baker
- Indigofera rhytidocarpa Benth. ex Harv.
- Indigofera richardsiae J.B.Gillett
- Indigofera rigioclada Craib
- Indigofera ripae N.E.Br.
- Indigofera rivularis Peter G.Wilson
- Indigofera robinsonii Schrire
- Indigofera rojasii Hassl.
- Indigofera roseocaerulea Baker f.
- Indigofera roseola Peter G.Wilson & Rowe
- Indigofera rostrata Bolus
- Indigofera rothii Baker
- Indigofera rotula Peter G.Wilson
- Indigofera rubroglandulosa Germish.
- Indigofera rubromarginata Thulin
- Indigofera rugosa Benth.
- Indigofera rumphiensis Schrire
- Indigofera rupicola Peter G.Wilson & Rowe
- Indigofera ruspolii Baker f.

== S ==
- Indigofera sabulosa Thulin
- Indigofera salmoniflora Rose
- Indigofera salteri du Preez & Schrire
- Indigofera sanguinea N.E.Br.
- Indigofera santapaui Sanjappa
- Indigofera santosii Torre
- Indigofera sarmentosa L.f.
- Indigofera saxicola F.Muell. ex Benth.
- Indigofera scabrella Kazandj. & Peter G.Wilson
- Indigofera scabrida Dunn
- Indigofera scarciesii Scott Elliot
- Indigofera schimperi Jaub. & Spach
- Indigofera schinzii N.E.Br.
- Indigofera schlechteri Baker f.
- Indigofera schliebenii Harms
- Indigofera schultziana F.Muell.
- Indigofera sclerophylla du Preez & Schrire
- Indigofera scopiformis Thulin
- Indigofera sebungweensis J.B.Gillett
- Indigofera secundiflora Poir.
- Indigofera sedgewickiana Vatke & Hildebrandt
- Indigofera semitrijuga Forssk.
- Indigofera semota du Preez & Schrire
- Indigofera senegalensis Lam.
- Indigofera sensitiva Franch.
- Indigofera sericovexilla C.T.White
- Indigofera serpentinicola Schrire
- Indigofera sesquipedalis C.B.Clarke ex Sanjappa
- Indigofera sessiliflora DC.
- Indigofera sessilifolia DC.
- Indigofera setiflora Baker
- Indigofera setosa N.E.Br.
- Indigofera shipingensis X.F.Gao
- Indigofera silvestrii Pamp.
- Indigofera simplicifolia Lam.
- Indigofera sinaloensis M.Sousa & Cruz Durán
- Indigofera sinuspersica Mozaff.
- Indigofera sisalis J.B.Gillett
- Indigofera smitinandii Mattapha & Chantar.
- Indigofera smutsii J.B.Gillett
- Indigofera sokotrana Vierh.
- Indigofera solirimae Schrire
- Indigofera sootepensis Craib
- Indigofera sordida Benth. ex Harv.
- Indigofera soutpansbergensis Schrire
- Indigofera sparsa Baker
- Indigofera sparteola Chiov.
- Indigofera sphaerocarpa A.Gray
- Indigofera sphinctosperma Standl.
- Indigofera spicata Forssk.
- Indigofera spinescens E.Mey.
- Indigofera spiniflora Hochst. ex Boiss.
- Indigofera spinosa Forssk.
- Indigofera splendens Ficalho & Hiern
- Indigofera squalida Prain
- Indigofera stachyodes Lindl.
- Indigofera stenophylla Guill. & Perr.
- Indigofera stenosepala Baker
- Indigofera sticta Craib
- Indigofera stokoei du Preez & Schrire
- Indigofera streyana Merxm.
- Indigofera stricta L.f.
- Indigofera strobilifera (Hochst.) Hochst. ex Baker
- Indigofera suarezensis Du Puy & Labat
- Indigofera suaveolens Jaub. & Spach
- Indigofera subargentea De Wild.
- Indigofera subcorymbosa Baker
- Indigofera subulata Vahl ex Poir.
- Indigofera subulifera Welw. ex Baker
- Indigofera suffruticosa Mill.
- Indigofera sulcata DC.
- Indigofera superba C.H.Stirt.
- Indigofera sutherlandioides Welw. ex Baker
- Indigofera swartbergensis du Preez & Schrire
- Indigofera swaziensis Bolus
- Indigofera sylvicola Schrire & K.W.Grieve
- Indigofera szechuensis Craib

== T ==
- Indigofera taborensis J.B.Gillett
- Indigofera taiwaniana T.C.Huang & M.J.Wu
- Indigofera tanaensis J.B.Gillett
- Indigofera tanganyikensis Baker f.
- Indigofera tanquana du Preez & Schrire
- Indigofera taruffiana Torre
- Indigofera taylorii J.B.Gillett
- Indigofera teixeirae Torre
- Indigofera tenuifolia Lam.
- Indigofera tenuipes Polhill
- Indigofera tenuissima E.Mey.
- Indigofera tephrosioides Kunth
- Indigofera terminalis Baker
- Indigofera tetraptera Taub.
- Indigofera tetrasperma Vahl ex Pers.
- Indigofera thibaudiana DC.
- Indigofera thikaensis J.B.Gillett
- Indigofera thomsonii Baker f.
- Indigofera thothathrii Sanjappa
- Indigofera thymoides Baker
- Indigofera tinctoria L.
- Indigofera tirunelvelica Sanjappa
- Indigofera tomentosa Eckl. & Zeyh.
- Indigofera torrei J.B.Gillett
- Indigofera torulosa E.Mey.
- Indigofera trachyphylla Benth.
- Indigofera transvaalensis Baker f.
- Indigofera trialata A.Chev.
- Indigofera trichopoda Lepr. ex Guill. & Perr.
- Indigofera triflora Peter G.Wilson & Rowe
- Indigofera trifoliata L.
- Indigofera trifolioides Baker f.
- Indigofera trigonelloides Jaub. & Spach
- Indigofera triquetra E.Mey.
- Indigofera tristis E.Mey.
- Indigofera tristoides N.E.Br.
- Indigofera trita L.f.
- Indigofera truxillensis Kunth
- Indigofera tryonii Domin
- Indigofera tsiangiana Metcalf
- Indigofera tumidula Rose
- Indigofera tysonii Baker f. ex Schrire & K.W.Grieve

== U–V ==
- Indigofera udonthaniensis Mattapha & Chantar.
- Indigofera ugandensis Baker f.
- Indigofera ultima (Kuntze) Peter G.Wilson
- Indigofera uniflora Buch.-Ham. ex Roxb.
- Indigofera uniseminalis Rzed. & R.Grether
- Indigofera vallicola Huan C.Wang & Jin L.Liu
- Indigofera vanderystii J.B.Gillett
- Indigofera vanwykii Schrire & K.W.Grieve
- Indigofera velutina E.Mey.
- Indigofera venulosa Champ. ex Benth.
- Indigofera venusta Eckl. & Zeyh.
- Indigofera verrucosa Eckl. & Zeyh.
- Indigofera verruculosa Peter G.Wilson
- Indigofera vestita Harv.
- Indigofera vicioides Jaub. & Spach
- Indigofera vigueri Callm. & Labat
- Indigofera viscidissima Baker
- Indigofera vlokii du Preez & Schrire
- Indigofera vohemarensis Baill.
- Indigofera volkensii Taub.

== W ==
- Indigofera wannanii Peter G.Wilson
- Indigofera warburtonensis Peter G.Wilson & Rowe
- Indigofera wenholdiae du Preez & Schrire
- Indigofera wentzeliana Harms
- Indigofera wightii Graham ex Wight & Arn.
- Indigofera wildiana J.B.Gillett
- Indigofera williamsonii (Harv.) N.E.Br.
- Indigofera wilmaniae Baker f. ex J.B.Gillett
- Indigofera wilsonii Craib
- Indigofera wituensis Baker f.
- Indigofera woodii Bolus

== X–Z ==
- Indigofera xerophila R.Vig.
- Indigofera yuanjiangensis X.F.Gao & X.L.Zhao
- Indigofera zanzibarica J.B.Gillett
- Indigofera zavattarii Chiov.
- Indigofera zenkeri Harms ex Baker f.
- Indigofera zollingeriana Miq.
- Indigofera zornioides Du Puy & Labat
