= Hakea standleyensis =

Scientific classification
- Kingdom: Plantae
- Clade: Tracheophytes
- Clade: Angiosperms
- Clade: Eudicots
- Order: Proteales
- Family: Proteaceae
- Genus: Hakea
- Species: H. standleyensis

Binomial name
- Hakea standleyensis Maconochie
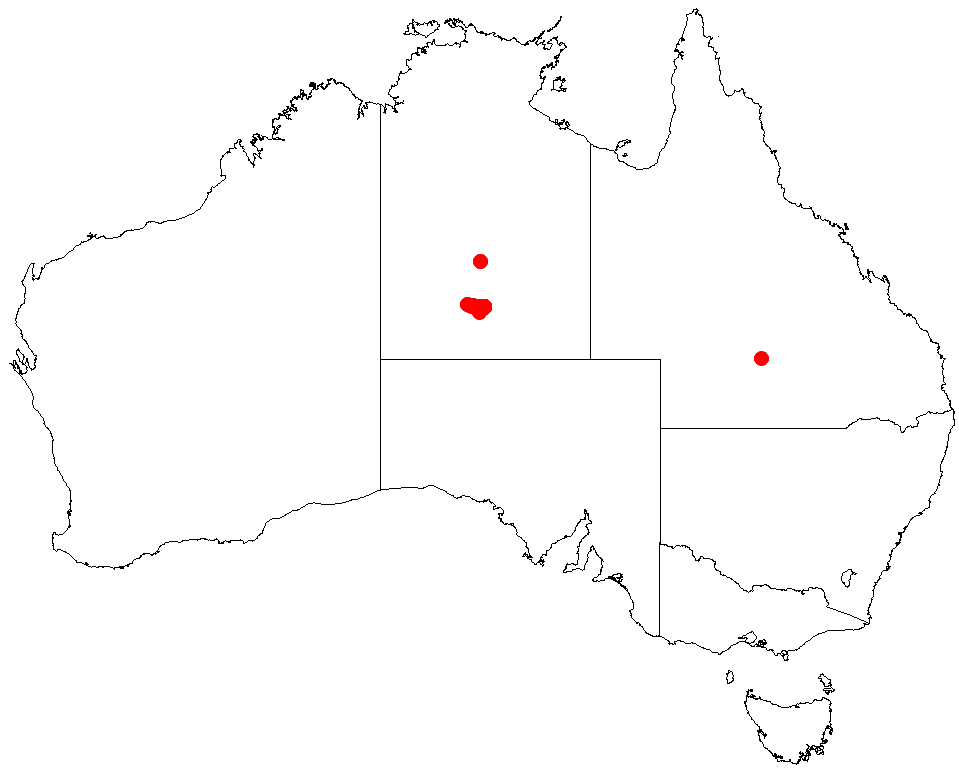
- Occurrence data from AVH

Species of shrub from the Northern Territory, Australia

Hakea standleyensis is a small flowering shrub in the family Proteaceae. It has white flowers, needle-shaped leaves and a twisted growth habit. It grows on cliff ledges in the Northern Territory, Australia.

== Description ==
Hakea standleyensis is a multi-stemmed sparse shrub 0.9–2 m (3–7 ft) tall and up to 1 m (3 ft) wide. The smaller branches and young leaves have dense silky hairs quickly becoming smooth. The needle-like leaves are often curved are crowded at the base 2–9.5 cm (0.8–4 in) long and 1.2–1.7 mm (0.05–0.07 in) wide. The inflorescence consists of 6–12 white flowers with over-lapping bracts surrounding each flower 4–5 mm (0.2–0.2 in) long on a short stalk. Flowering occurs from September to October and the fruit are egg-shaped 1.3–1.5 cm (0.5–0.6 in) long and 4.5–6 mm (0.2–0.2 in) wide with a wrinkled bluish-green surface ending and in a 1 mm (0.04 in) point.

== Taxonomy and naming ==
Hakea standleyensis was first formally described in 1973 by John Maconchie who published the description in Transactions of the Royal Society of South Australia. Named after Standley Chasm in the Macdonnell Ranges one of the localities where it is found.

== Distribution and habitat ==
Hakea standleyensis is restricted to the Macdonnell Ranges in the Northern Territory where it grows in skeletal soil on ledges of quartzite cliff faces.

== Conservation status ==
Hakea standleyensis is considered 'Rare' in J.D.Briggs & J.H.Leigh, Rare or Threatened Australian Plants (1995).
