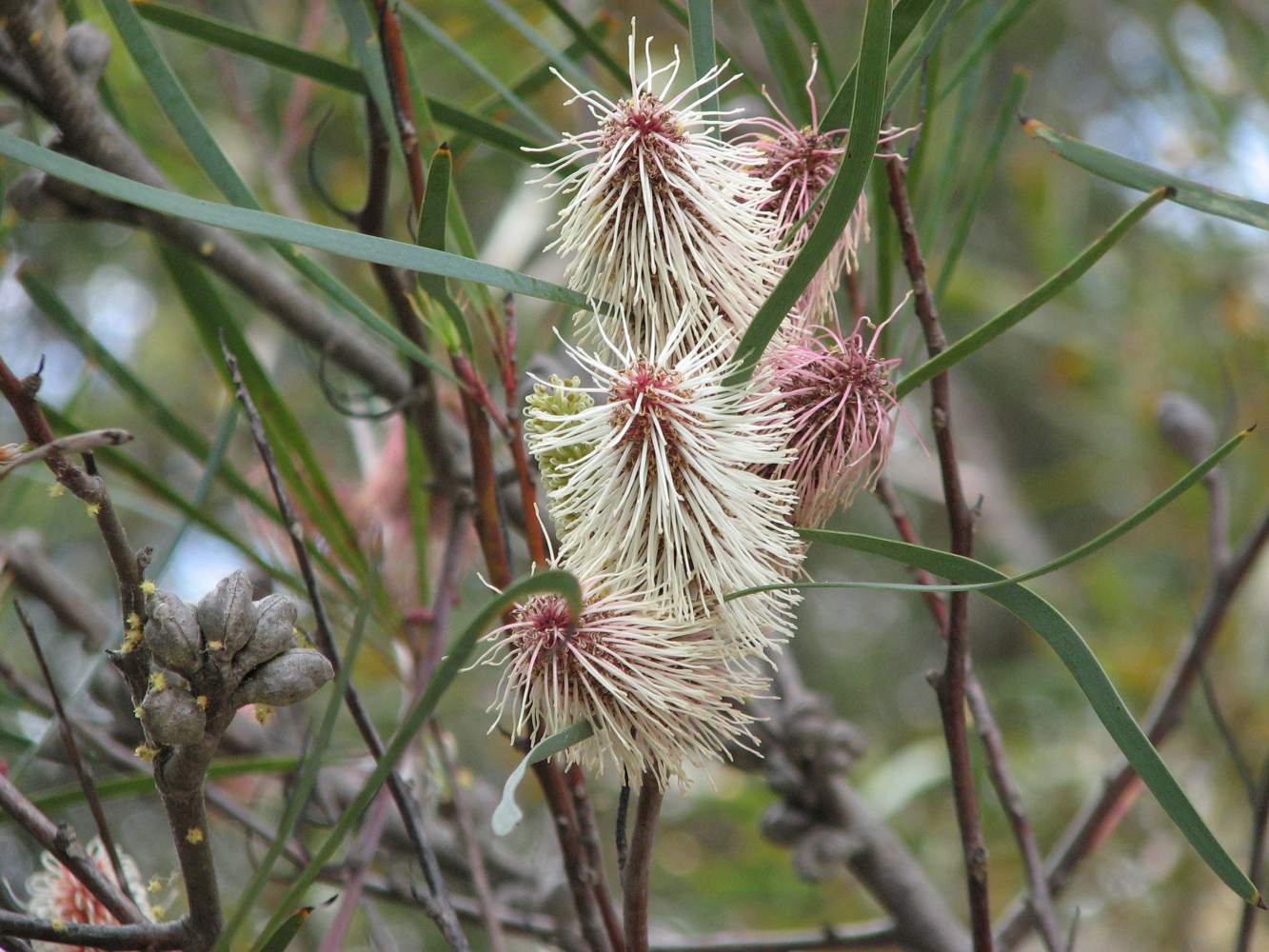
- Hakea minyma in Maranoa Gardens

Scientific classification
- Kingdom: Plantae
- Clade: Tracheophytes
- Clade: Angiosperms
- Clade: Eudicots
- Order: Proteales
- Family: Proteaceae
- Genus: Hakea
- Species: H. minyma

Binomial name
- Hakea minyma Maconochie
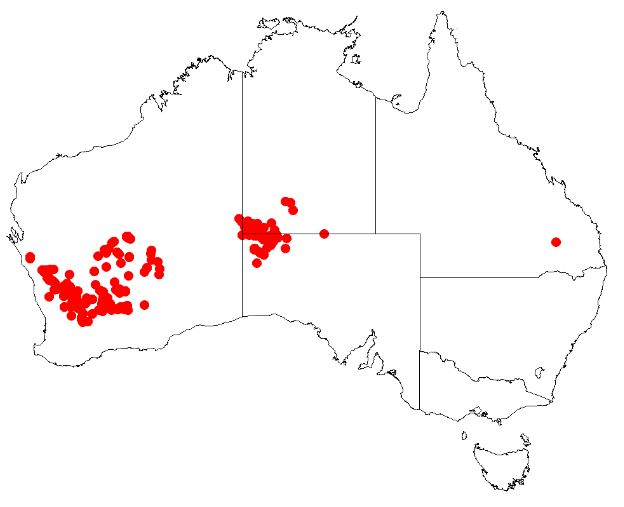
- Occurrence data from AVH

Synonyms
- Hakea glabella R.Br.

= Hakea minyma =

Watjula

Species of shrub endemic to Australia

Hakea minyma, commonly known as watjula, is a species of shrub that is endemic to Australia. It has long, flat leaves, fragrant pink or white flower from late winter to spring.

== Description ==
Hakea minyma is a multi-stemmed rounded shrub to 3 m (10 ft) tall with smooth grey bark. The leaves are more than 16 cm (6 in) long and are flat with longitudinal veins ending in a blunt point. Attractive sweetly scented pink or white flowers appear in the leaf axils from August to October. The fruit are smooth, egg shaped, with an upturned beak, turning from brown to grey with age. It has a rounded habit, usually growing to between 1.2 and 3 m (3 ft 11 in and 9 ft 10 in) with long, narrow leaves. Cream or pink flowers are produced in axillary racemose inflorescences between August and November in its native range.

== Taxonomy and naming ==
The species was first formally described by botanist J.R. Maconchie in 1973 and the description was published in Transactions of the Royal Society of South Australia. The specific epithet minmya is from the Pitjantjatjara word for woman, alludes to the shape of the fruits.

== Distribution and habitat ==
It occurs in Western Australia, the Northern Territory and South Australia. In Western Australia it grows in semi-arid areas south through Mullewa to Merredin and Coolgardie. It is found in north western South Australia in the Central Ranges and the Great Victoria Desert and in the south western parts of the Northern Territory extending north east to the MacDonnell Ranges. Hakea minyma grows on sandy loam in mallee and mulga woodlands also on spinifex dominated sandplains and dune swales and less commonly on rocky or gravelly ranges.

== Conservation status ==
Hakea minyma is classified as "not threatened" by the Western Australian Government.
