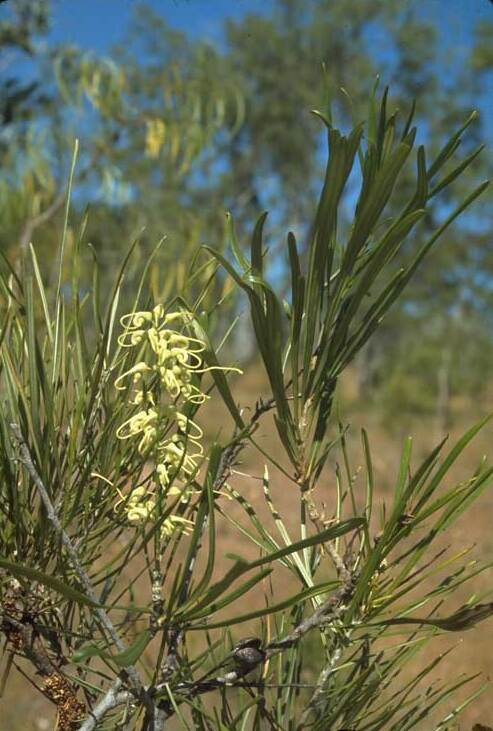
- Near Mareeba

Scientific classification
- Kingdom: Plantae
- Clade: Tracheophytes
- Clade: Angiosperms
- Clade: Eudicots
- Order: Proteales
- Family: Proteaceae
- Genus: Grevillea
- Species: G. mcgillivrayi

Binomial name
- Grevillea mcgillivrayi I.M.Turner

Synonyms
- Grevillea coriacea McGill. nom. illeg.; Grevillea macgillivrayi Olde orth. var.

= Grevillea mcgillivrayi =

Species of shrub endemic to Queensland, Australia

Grevillea mcgillivrayi is a species of flowering plant in the family Proteaceae and is endemic to Queensland in Australia. It is slender tree with linear to strap-like leaves, and cylindrical clusters of white to cream-coloured flowers, the style sometimes turning pink with age.

== Description ==
Grevillea mcgillivrayi is a slender tree that typically grows to a height of 4–15 m (13–49 ft). The leaves are linear to strap-like, 80–300 mm (3.1–11.8 in) long, 4–10 mm (0.16–0.39 in) wide the edges rolled under, the lower surface silky-hairy and the midvein is prominent. The flowers are arranged in cylindrical clusters, sometimes branched, 80–150 mm (3.1–5.9 in) long, the flowers at the bottom of each cluster opening first. The flowers are white to cream-coloured and glabrous, the style sometimes turning red with age, the pistil 33–42 mm (1.3–1.7 in) long. Flowering occurs from July to September, and the fruit is a lens-shaped follicle about 21–28 mm (0.83–1.10 in) long.

== Taxonomy ==
This grevillea was first formally described in 1975 by Donald McGillivray who gave it the name Grevillea coriacea, but that name is a nomen illegitimum because it was already used for a fossil species. In 2014, Ian Mark Turner changed the name to Grevillea mcgillivrayi in Annales Botanici Fennici.

== Distribution and habitat ==
Grevillea mcgillivrayi grows in forest and woodland, often on dry slopes, and is found in north-eastern Queensland from north of Cooktown to Mount Mulligan and Mount Molloy.

== Conservation status ==
This grevillea is listed as of least concern under the Queensland Government Nature Conservation Act 1992.
