= Acacia neorigida =

Scientific classification
- Kingdom: Plantae
- Clade: Tracheophytes
- Clade: Angiosperms
- Clade: Eudicots
- Clade: Rosids
- Order: Fabales
- Family: Fabaceae
- Subfamily: Caesalpinioideae
- Clade: Mimosoid clade
- Genus: Acacia
- Species: A. neorigida

Binomial name
- Acacia neorigida I.M.Turner

Synonyms
- Acacia rigida Maslin nom. illeg.; Racosperma rigidum Pedley

Species of legume

Acacia neorigida is a species of flowering plant in the family Fabaceae, and is endemic to the south-west of Western Australia. It is a compact or intricate and sprawling shrub with reddish-orange branchlets, unsymmetrically lance-shaped to narrowly lance-shaped phyllodes, spherical heads of golden yellow flowers and leathery, shallowly curved pods.

== Description ==
Acacia neorigida is sometimes a compact shrub, otherwise an intricate or sprawling and diffuse shrub that typically grows to a height of up to 1.5 m (4 ft 11 in) and 3.5 m (11 ft) wide and has reddish orange branchlets. Its phyllodes are unsymmetrically lance-shaped to narrowly lance-shaped, sometimes narrowly linear, usually 9–14 mm (0.35–0.55 in) long, 1.2–2 mm (0.047–0.079 in) wide sharply pointed, rigid and usually glabrous with a prominent midrib and five veins. The flowers are borne in a spherical head in axils on peduncles usually 5–9 mm (0.20–0.35 in) wide, each head with 98 to 12 loosely arranged, golden yellow flowers. Flowering occurs sporadically in most months, with a peak in May and June. The pods are curved, terete, up to 60 mm (2.4 in) long, 4.5 mm (0.18 in) wide, and leathery. The seeds are oblong. 5.5 mm (0.22 in) long with a conical aril on the end.

== Taxonomy ==
This species was first formally described in 1999 by Bruce Maslin who gave it the name Acacia rigida in the journal Nuytsia from specimens he collected 7.5 km (4.7 mi) east of Corrigin towards Bendering in 1976, but that name was illegitimate because it had already been given to a fossil species. In 2014, Ian Mark Turner changed the name to Acacia neorigida in the journal Annales Botanici Fennici.

== Distribution and habitat ==
This species of wattle grows in shrubland or woodland in deep sand, loam or clay from near Kellerberrin with the western margin ranging from Meckering and the Darling Range to Cuballing in the Avon Wheatbelt, Jarrah Forest and Mallee bioregions in the south-west of Western Australia.

== See also ==
- List of Acacia species
