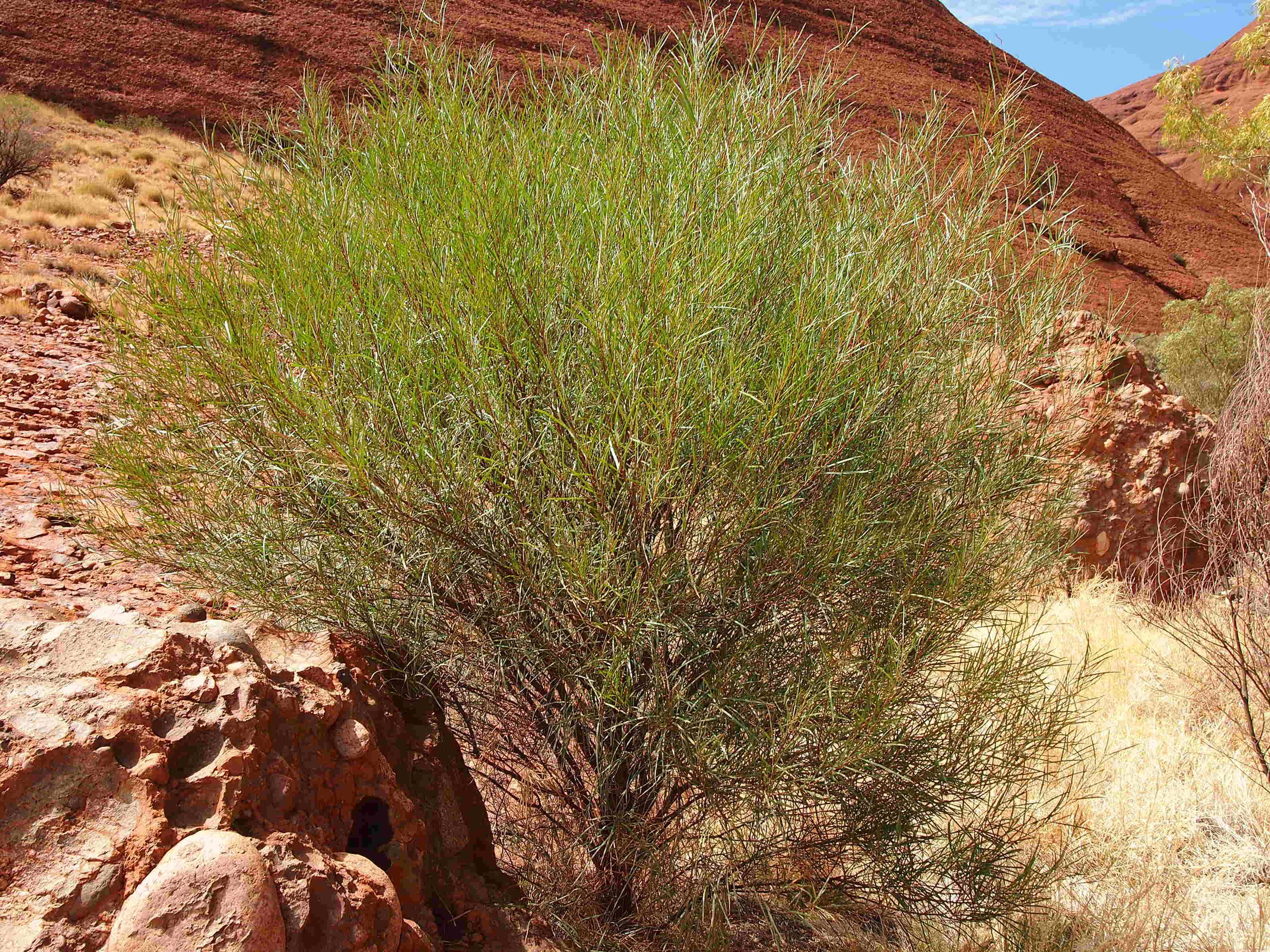

Scientific classification
- Kingdom: Plantae
- Clade: Tracheophytes
- Clade: Angiosperms
- Clade: Eudicots
- Clade: Rosids
- Order: Fabales
- Family: Fabaceae
- Subfamily: Caesalpinioideae
- Clade: Mimosoid clade
- Genus: Acacia
- Species: A. olgana

Binomial name
- Acacia olgana Maconochie
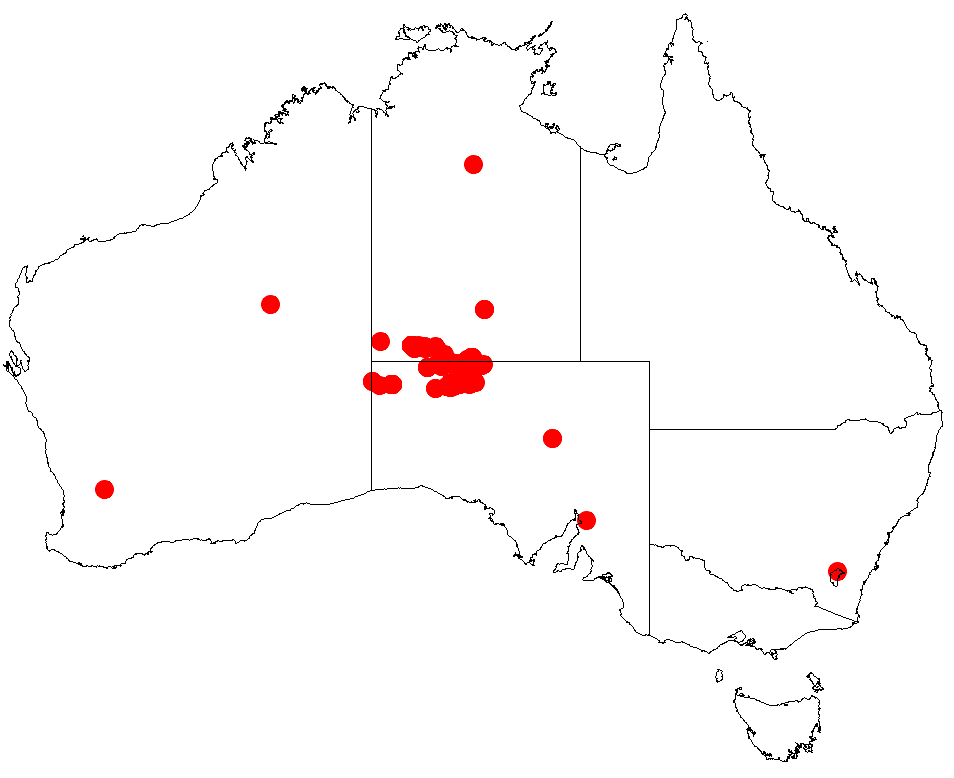
- Occurrence data from AVH

Synonyms
- Racosperma olganum (Maconochie) Pedley; Acacia signata auct. non F.Muell.: Black, J.M. (January 1948)

= Acacia olgana =

Kata Tjuta wattle

Species of plant

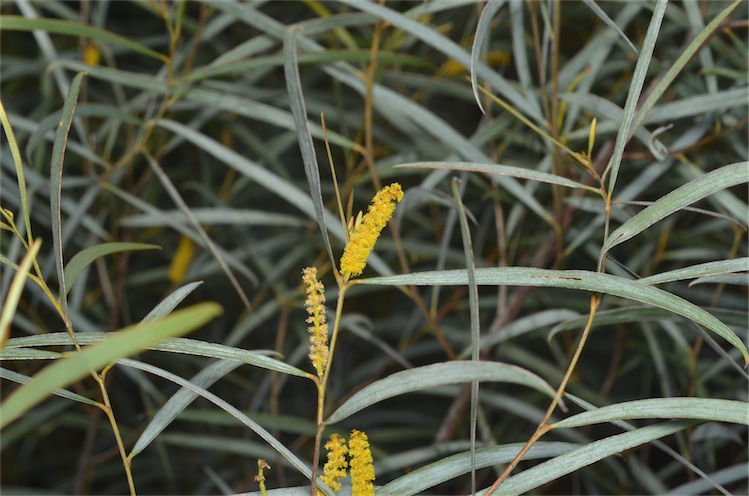
Flower in the Australian National Botanic Gardens

Acacia olgana, commonly known as Mount Olga wattle or Kata Tjuta wattle is a species of flowering plant in the family Fabaceae, and is endemic to central Australia. It is a shrub or small tree with rough bark, mostly glabrous light brown to reddish branchlets, linear to very narrowly elliptic, leathery phyllodes, spikes of bright or golden yellow flowers and linear, papery to leathery pods.

== Description ==
Acacia olgana is a shrub or small tree that typically grows to a height of up to 6 m (20 ft), sometimes up to 15 m (49 ft) and has rough, slightly fissured grey or grey-brown bark and mostly glabrous light brown to reddish branchlets that are angular or flattened near the ends. Its phyllodes are linear to very narrowly elliptic, 60–180 mm (2.4–7.1 in) long and 2–7 mm (0.079–0.276 in) wide, flat, often curved near the tip, with one prominent central vein and an inconspicuous gland up to 5 mm (0.20 in) above the pulvinus. The flowers are bright or golden yellow and borne in densely-flowered spikes 15–40 mm (0.59–1.57 in) long on peduncles up to 3 mm (0.12 in) long. Flowering occurs from May to September, and the pods are linear, straight to slightly curved, 35–100 mm (1.4–3.9 in) long, mostly 3–5 mm (0.12–0.20 in) wide and papery to leathery. The seeds are broadly oblong to broadly elliptic, 3.1–5 mm (0.12–0.20 in) long, and dark brown.

== Taxonomy ==
Acacia olgana was first formally described in 1978 by the John Richard Maconochie in the Journal of the Adelaide Botanic Gardens from specimens collected in the Central Amphitheatre, Valley of Heads at Kata Tjuta in 1958. The specific epithet (olgana) means 'belonging to Mount Olga'.

== Distribution and habitat ==
Mount Olga wattle often grows along watercourses in gorges and crevices on rocky ranges on sedimentary or conglomerate rocks, sometimes on sand dunes, in shrubland and woodland in the Uluru area and the Olgas in the Central Ranges, Finke, Gibson Desert, Great Sandy Desert and Great Victoria Desert bioregions in the south-west of the Northern Territory, and several hilly ranges in north-western South Australia.

== See also ==
- List of Acacia species
