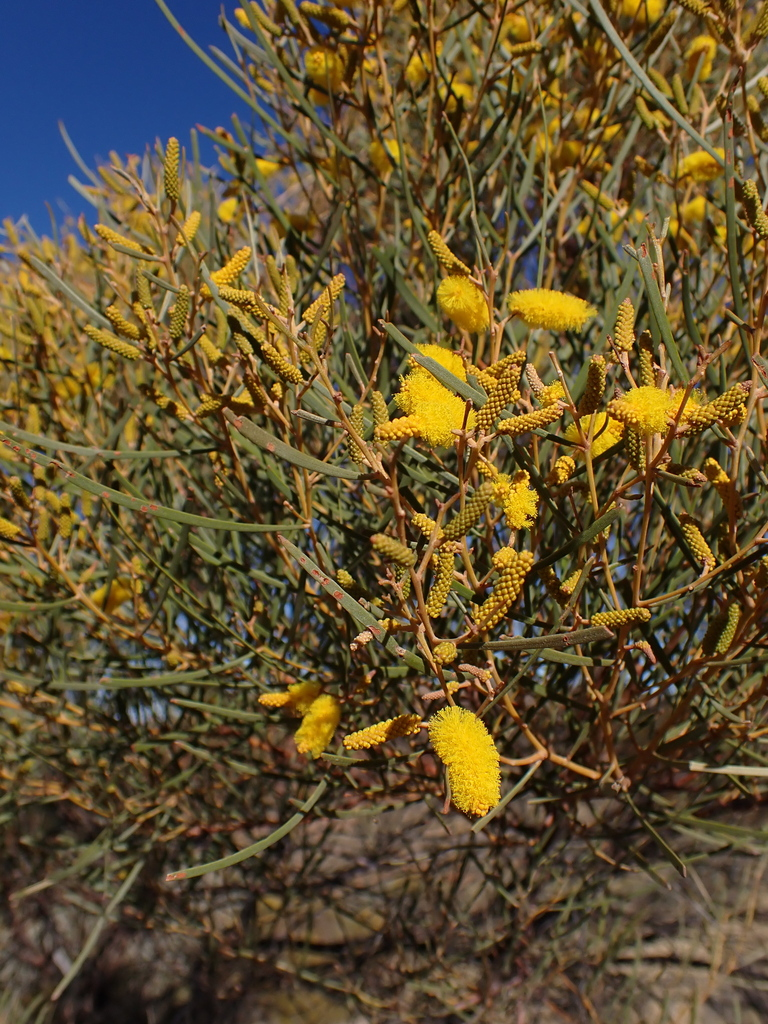
- In the Western MacDonnell Ranges

Scientific classification
- Kingdom: Plantae
- Clade: Tracheophytes
- Clade: Angiosperms
- Clade: Eudicots
- Clade: Rosids
- Order: Fabales
- Family: Fabaceae
- Subfamily: Caesalpinioideae
- Clade: Mimosoid clade
- Genus: Acacia
- Species: A. macdonnelliensis

Binomial name
- Acacia macdonnelliensis Maconochie

Synonyms
- List: Acacia macdonnelliensis Maconochie orth. var.; Racosperma macdonnellense (Maconochie) Pedley

= Acacia macdonnelliensis =

Species of legume

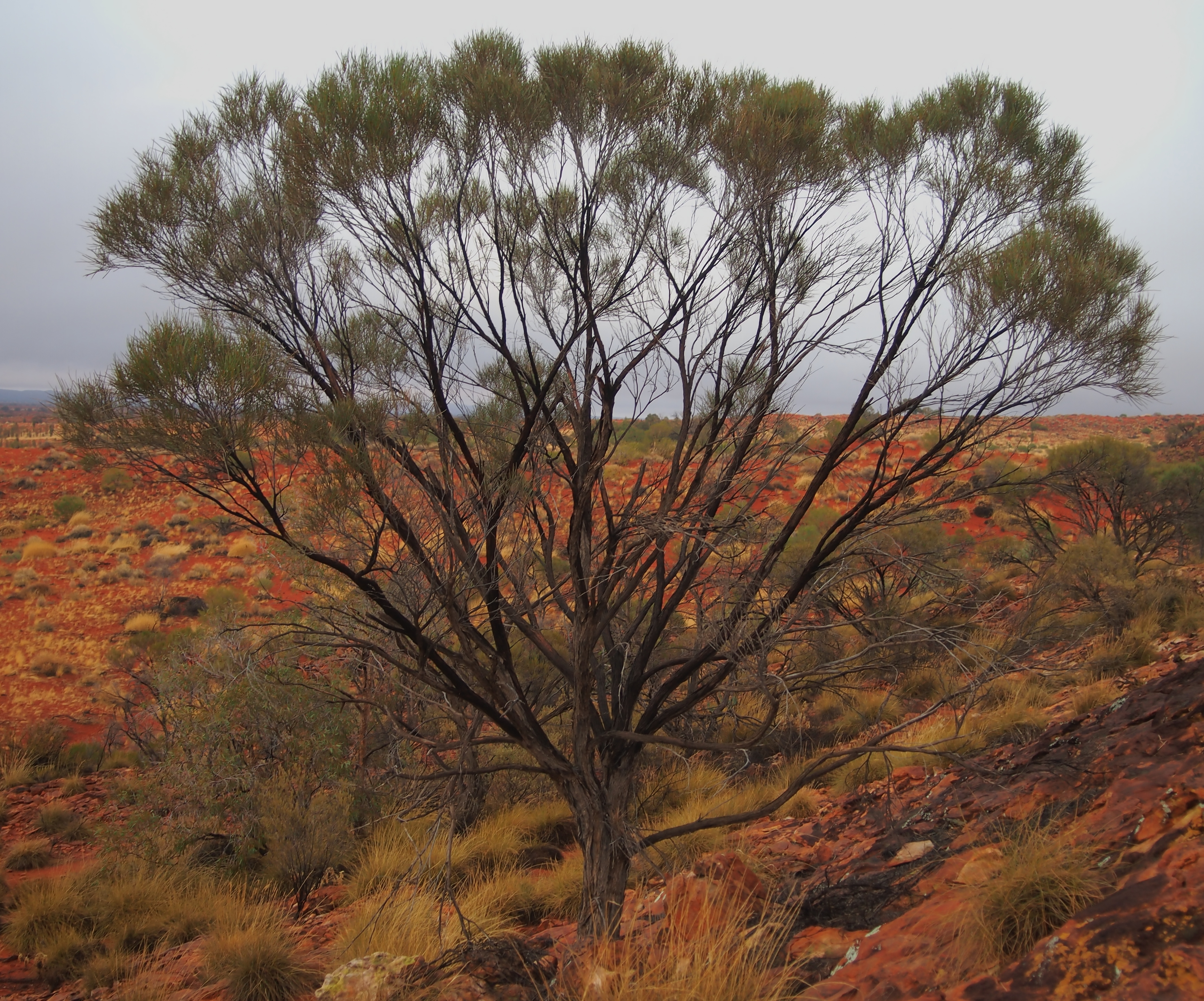
Habit subsp. teretifolia

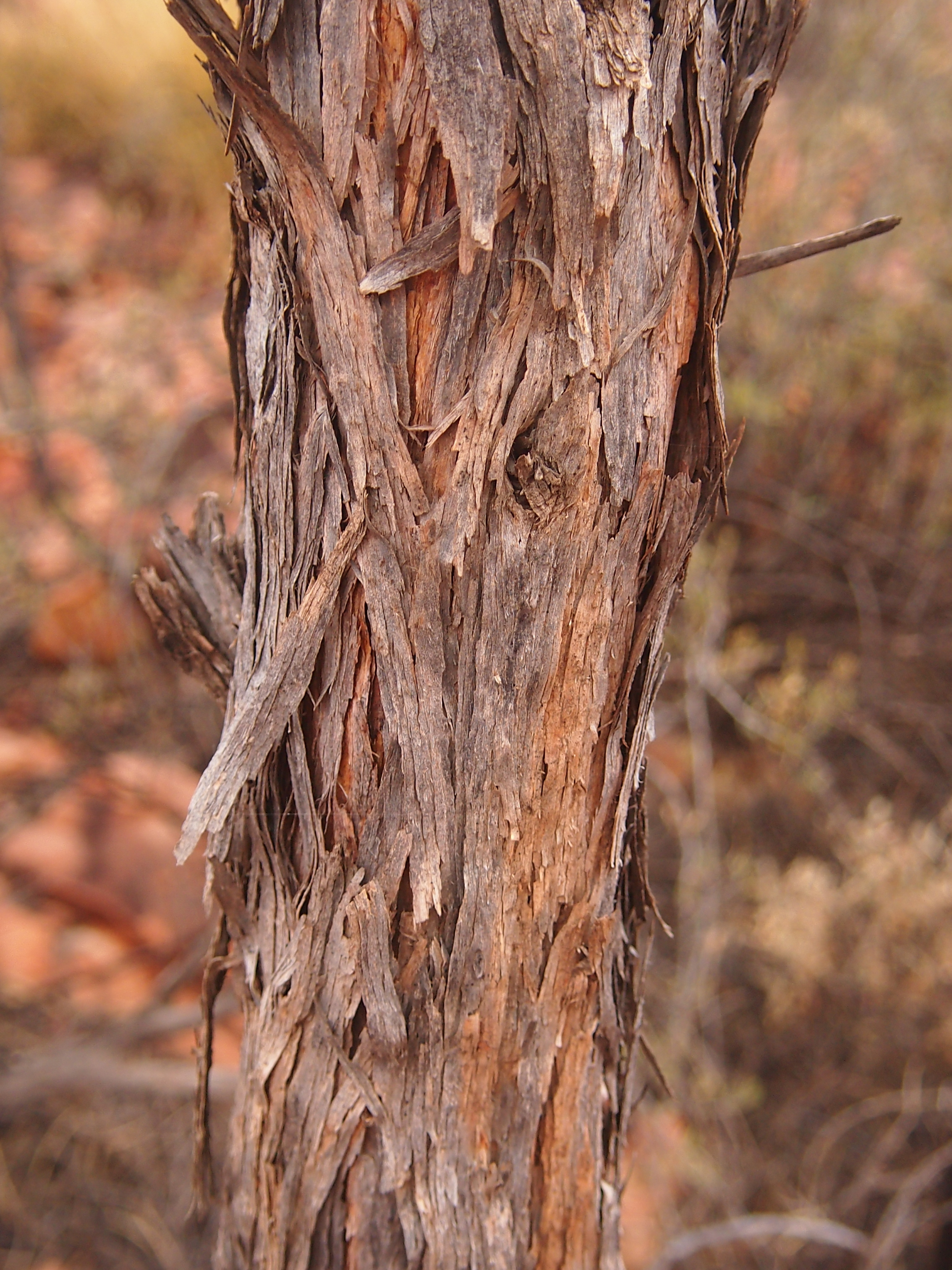
Bark

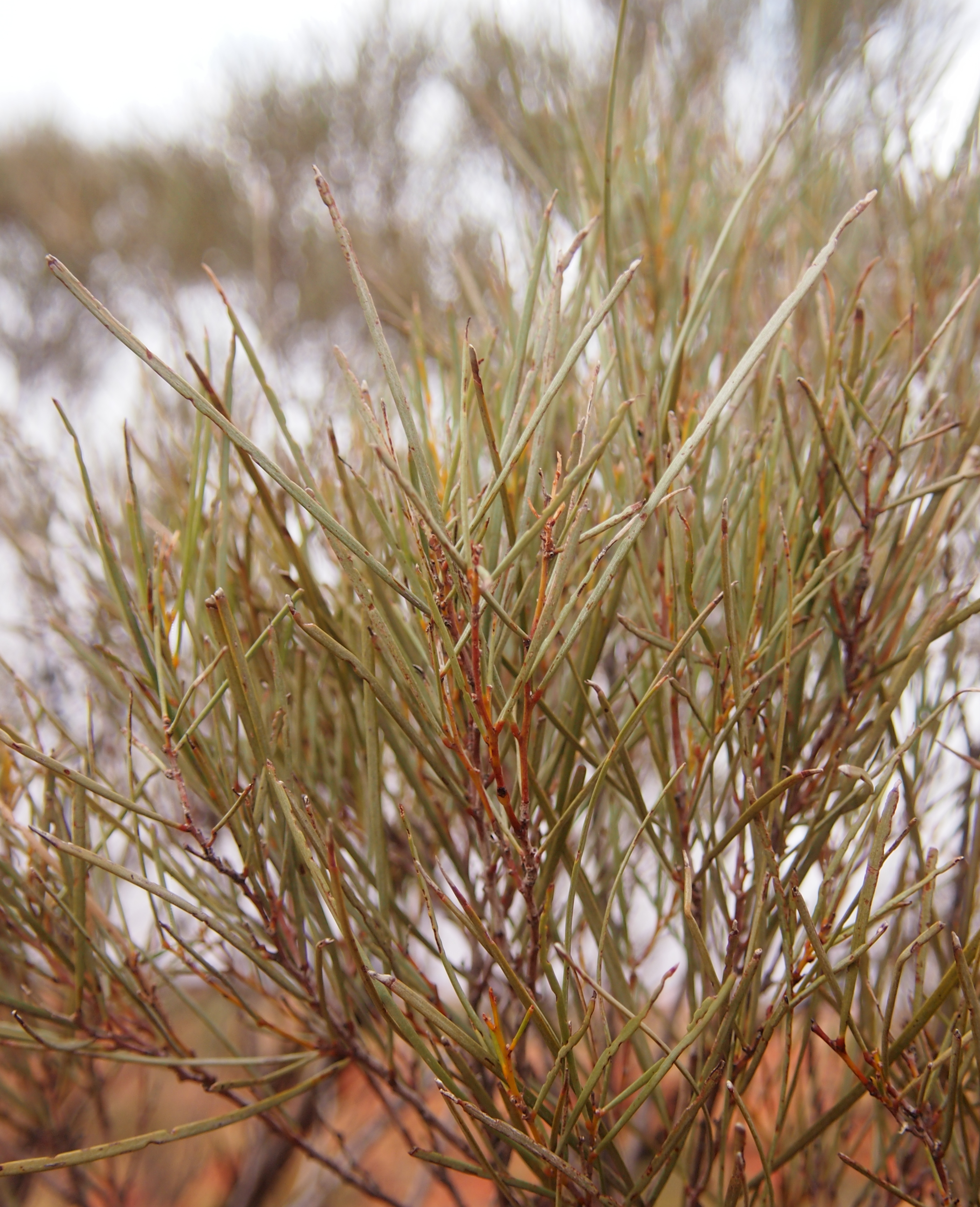
Foliage of subspecies teretifolia

Acacia macdonnelliensis, commonly known as MacDonnell mulga or Hill mulga, is a species of flowering plant in the family Fabaceae and is endemic to central Australia. The Alyawarr people know the plant as irrar, the Kaytetye know it as arleth-arlethe or arwele arleth-arlethe and the Western Arrernte people know it as irrkwarteke. It is a shrub or tree with deeply fissured grey bark, erect, very narrowly elliptic to linear or thread-like phyllodes, dense spikes of golden yellow flowers, and linear, papery pods slightly constricted between the seeds.

== Description ==
Acacia macdonnelliensis is shrub or tree that typically grows to a height of 3–6 m (9.8–19.7 ft) and one or several trunks with deeply fissured grey bark and branchlets sometimes covered with a few hairs, otherwise glabrous. Its phyllodes are erect, very narrowly elliptic to linear or thread-like, straight to slightly sickle-shaped, 40–150 mm (1.6–5.9 in) long, 0.5–7 mm (0.020–0.276 in) wide and leathery, with a hook-like tip. The flowers are golden yellow, densely arranged in spikes mostly 10–30 mm (0.39–1.18 in) long and 3–6 mm (0.12–0.24 in) in diameter on peduncles 2–5 mm (0.079–0.197 in) long. Flowering time depends on subspecies, and the pods are linear, 30–95 mm (1.2–3.7 in) long, 2–4 mm (0.079–0.157 in) wide, papery, pale brown and slightly constricted between the seeds. The seeds are 2.5–5 mm (0.098–0.197 in) long and dark brown with a whitish aril.

== Taxonomy ==
Acacia macdonnelliensis was first formally described in 1978 by John Richard Maconochie in the Journal of the Adelaide Botanic Garden from specimens he found in Serpentine Gorge in 1967.

In 1987, Bruce Maslin described two subspecies of A. macdonnelliensis in the journal Nuytsia, and the names are accepted by the Australian Plant Census:

- Acacia macdonnelliensis subsp. macdonnelliensis Maconochie has flat phyllodes, the racemes 4–16 mm (0.16–0.63 in) long and flowers from April to September.
- Acacia macdonnelliensis subsp. teretifolia Maslin has terete phyllodes, the racemes mostly 1–7 mm (0.039–0.276 in) long and flowers from June to August.

== Distribution and habitat ==
Acacia macdonelliensis is found in southern parts of the Northern Territory around Alice Springs and in far eastern Pilbara and north eastern Goldfields regions of Western Australia. It grows in areas of sandstone and quartzite along rocky ridges and creeklines. A. macdonnelliensis is drought and frost tolerant.

- Subspecies macdonnellensis is common in the MacDonnell Ranges to the Petermann Ranges in the Northern Territory, but is rare between them. It is only recorded from the Pollock Hills in Western Australia.
- Subspecies teretifolia is restricted to the Rawlinson Ranges in Western Australia extending to the Petermann Ranges in the Northern Territory.
