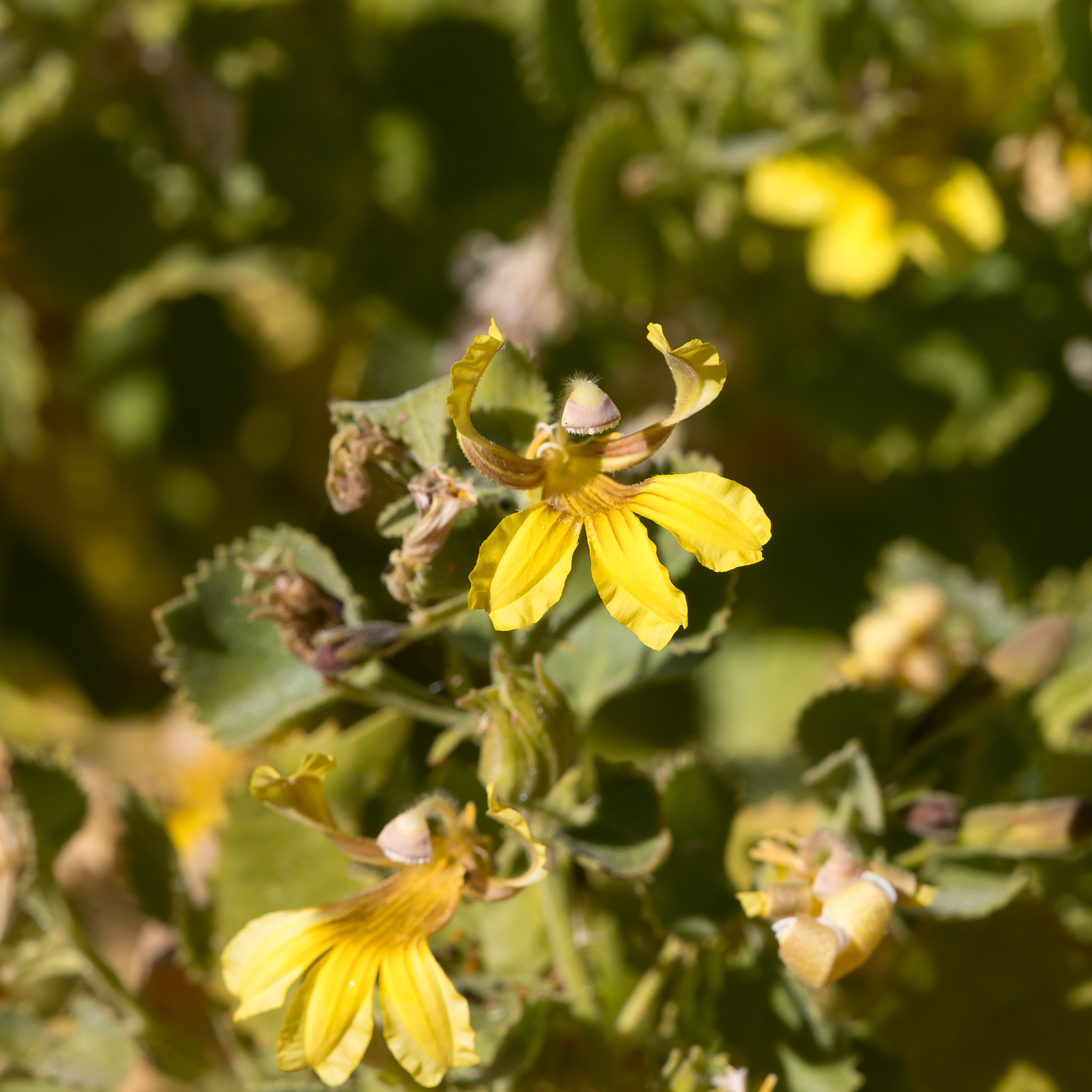
- Goodenia grandiflora at Mount Isa

Scientific classification
- Kingdom: Plantae
- Clade: Tracheophytes
- Clade: Angiosperms
- Clade: Eudicots
- Clade: Asterids
- Order: Asterales
- Family: Goodeniaceae
- Genus: Goodenia
- Species: G. grandiflora

Binomial name
- Goodenia grandiflora Sims

Synonyms
- Goodenia appendiculata Jacq.; ?Goodenia grandiflora Bonpl. nom. illeg.; Goodenia grandiflora Sims var. grandiflora; Goodenia grandiflora Bonpl. var. grandiflora nom. superfl.; Goodenia horniana F.Muell. & Tate ex Tate; Goodenia mollis R.Br.; Goodenoughia grandiflora (Sims) Siebert & Voss

= Goodenia grandiflora =

Large-flowered goodenia

Species of plant

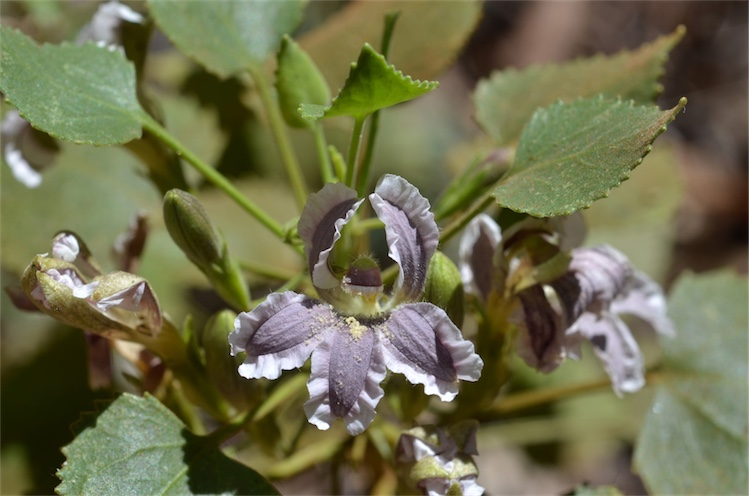
Purple form at Standley Chasm

Goodenia grandiflora, commonly known as large-flowered goodenia, pinnate goodenia or mountain primrose, is a species of flowering plant in the family Goodeniaceae and is endemic to Australia. It is an erect under-shrub with toothed, egg-shaped to round leaves and racemes or thyrses of yellow, white or purplish flowers.

== Description ==
Goodenia grandiflora is an erect under-shrub that typically grows to a height of 1.5 m (4 ft 11 in) with sticky, hairy foliage. The leaves have an egg-shaped to rounded lamina 25–50 mm (0.98–1.97 in) long and up to 60 mm (2.4 in) wide on a petiole up to 50 mm (2.0 in) long, the edges of the leaves toothed and the base heart-shaped. The flowers are arranged in racemes or thyrses up to 250 mm (9.8 in) long on a peduncle up to 3 mm (0.12 in) long with leaf-like bracts at the base. Each flower is on a pedicel up to 50 mm (2.0 in) long with linear bracteoles up to 4 mm (0.16 in) long. The sepals are lance-shaped, up to 6 mm (0.24 in) long and the petals are yellow, white or purple and up to 23 mm (0.91 in) long. The lower lobes of the corolla are 8–9 mm (0.31–0.35 in) long with wings about 3 mm (0.12 in) wide. Flowering occurs in most months but mainly from May to November and the fruit is an oval capsule 10–13 mm (0.39–0.51 in) long.

== Taxonomy and naming ==
Goodenia grandiflora was first formally described in 1805 by John Sims in the Botanical Magazine. The specific epithet (grandiflora) means "large-flowered".

== Distribution and habitat ==
This goodenia grows in rocky places on hills in Western Australia, the Northern Territory, Queensland and eastern New South Wales.

== Conservation status ==
Goodenia grandiflora is classified as "Priority One" by the Government of Western Australia Department of Parks and Wildlife, meaning that it is known from only one or a few locations which are potentially at risk, but as of "least concern" in the Northern Territory and Queensland.
