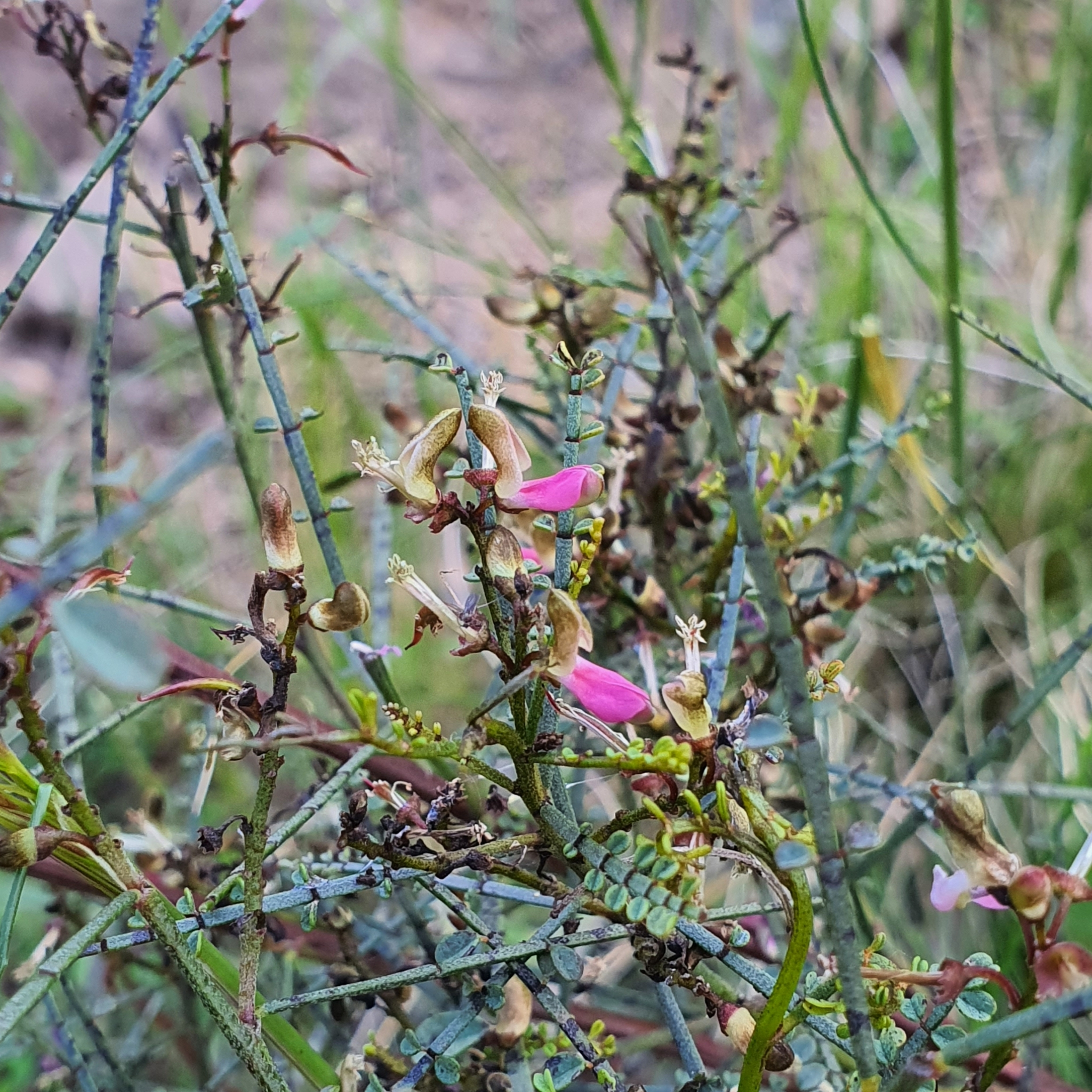

Scientific classification
- Kingdom: Plantae
- Clade: Tracheophytes
- Clade: Angiosperms
- Clade: Eudicots
- Clade: Rosids
- Order: Fabales
- Family: Fabaceae
- Subfamily: Faboideae
- Genus: Indigofera
- Species: I. adesmiifolia

Binomial name
- Indigofera adesmiifolia A.Gray

= Indigofera adesmiifolia =

Tick indigo

Species of plant

Indigofera adesmiifolia, commonly known as tick indigo, is a flowering plant in the family Fabaceae and grows in eastern states of Australia. It is a small shrub with pink pea flowers and pinnate leaves.

== Description ==
Indigofera adesmiifolia is a shrub 0.5–3 m (1 ft 8 in – 9 ft 10 in) high with scattered, flattened hairs. The pinnate leaves up to 6.5 cm (2.6 in) long, 1–4 mm (0.039–0.157 in) wide and the rachis flattened. The leaflets are small, egg-shaped, rounded at the apex or partly notched, 1.5–7 mm (0.059–0.276 in) long, 1–2 mm (0.039–0.079 in) wide, arranged either side of the flattened midrib and rust-red coloured hairs. The pale pink to rose pink corolla 2.5–7.5 cm (0.98–2.95 in) long, in groupings of 5-20, pedicel about 2 mm (0.079 in) long, brown triangular-shaped bracts, shorter than the floral tube and the calyx hairy. Flowering occurs from September to December and the fruit is a pod 2–4 cm (0.79–1.57 in) long with occasional hairs.

== Taxonomy ==
Indigofera adesmiifolia was first formally described in 1854 by Asa Gray and the description was published in United States Exploring Expedition Phanerogamia.

== Distribution and habitat ==
Tick indigo grows in woodland on rocky slopes and ranges in New South Wales, Victoria, Queensland and the Australian Capital Territory.

== See also ==
- List of Indigofera species
