= Acacia maconochieana =

Mullan wattle

Scientific classification
- Kingdom: Plantae
- Clade: Tracheophytes
- Clade: Angiosperms
- Clade: Eudicots
- Clade: Rosids
- Order: Fabales
- Family: Fabaceae
- Subfamily: Caesalpinioideae
- Clade: Mimosoid clade
- Genus: Acacia
- Species: A. maconochieana

Binomial name
- Acacia maconochieana Pedley
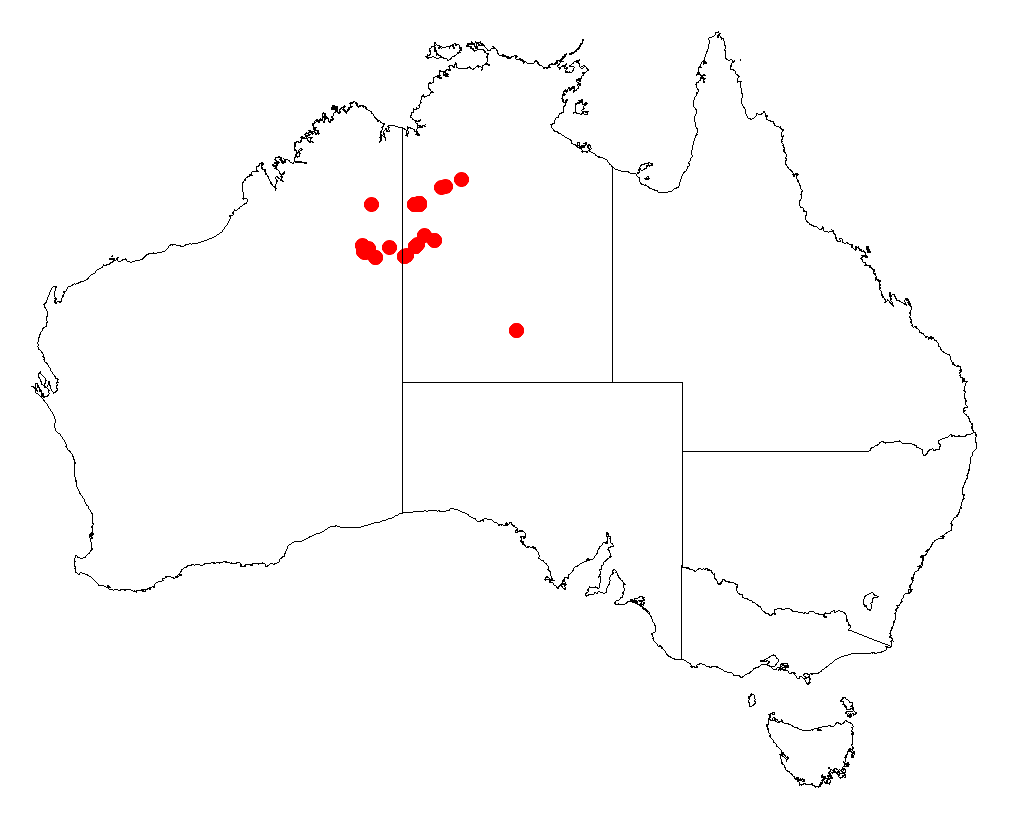

Synonyms
- Acacia sp. aff. cambagei; Racosperma maconochieanum (Pedley) Pedley

Species of legume

Acacia maconochieana, commonly known as mullan wattle or salt wattle, is a species of flowering plant in the family Fabaceae and is endemic to arid areas of north-western Australia. It is a tree with fissured grey bark, hairy branchlets, linear phyllodes, spherical heads of golden yellow flowers, and leathery pods, appearing somewhat like a string of beads.

== Description ==
Acacia maconochieana is a tree that typically grows to a height of 2.5–12 m (8 ft 2 in – 39 ft 4 in) and has longitudinally fissured grey bark and branchlets densely covered with silvery white hairs near the outer parts. Its phyllodes are linear, 80–180 mm (3.1–7.1 in) long, 2–5 mm (0.079–0.197 in) wide, with many closely parallel veins, and densely covered with silvery white hairs pressed against the surface. The flowers are borne in two to four spherical heads in racemes 2–3 mm (0.079–0.118 in) long, on hairy peduncles 5–8 mm (0.20–0.31 in) long, each head about 5 mm (0.20 in) in diameter with 20 to 25 golden yellow flowers. Flowering occurs in October, and the pods are straight, up to 130 mm (5.1 in) long, 4–5 mm (0.16–0.20 in) wide, leathery, densely hairy and appearing somewhat like a string of beads. The seeds are oblong to broadly elliptic, 4–6 mm (0.16–0.24 in) long and black with a small white aril.

== Taxonomy ==
Acacia maconochieana was first formally described in 1986 by Leslie Pedley in the journal Austrobaileya from specimens collected by John Richard Maconochie. The specific epithet (maconochieana) commemorates John Maconochie, "a knowledgeable botanist and a good companion".

== Distribution and habitat ==
Mullan wattle occurs around Gregory salt lake in northern Western Australia, extending east to Nongra Lake in the Tanami Desert, in the Central Kimberley, Great Sandy Desert, MacDonnell Ranges, Ord Victoria Plain and Tanami bioregions. It usually grows in low open forest, woodland or open scrubland.

== Aboriginal names ==
The Walmajarri people of the Paruku IPA in the Kimberley call this wattle Wirimangurru. Other Aboriginal names are (Jaru) gunanduru, wirrimangurru and (Ngarinyman) Gunadurr.

== See also ==
- List of Acacia species
