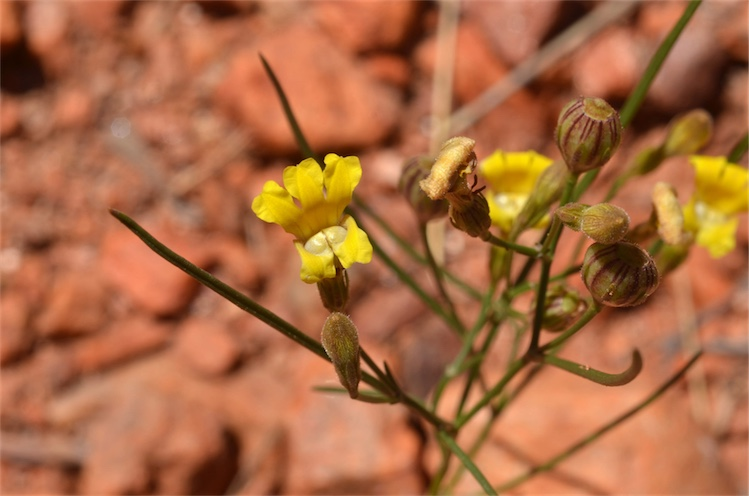
- Near Standley Chasm

Scientific classification
- Kingdom: Plantae
- Clade: Tracheophytes
- Clade: Angiosperms
- Clade: Eudicots
- Clade: Asterids
- Order: Asterales
- Family: Goodeniaceae
- Genus: Goodenia
- Species: G. triodiophila

Binomial name
- Goodenia triodiophila Carolin

= Goodenia triodiophila =

Spinifex goodenia

Species of plant

Goodenia triodiophila, commonly known as spinifex goodenia in the Northern Territory, is a species of flowering plant in the family Goodeniaceae and is endemic to arid inland areas of Central Australia. It is a stiff, wiry, much-branched, ascending perennial herb with needle-shaped or linear leaves on the stems and racemes of yellow flowers with a brownish centre.

== Description ==
Goodenia triodiophila is a stiff, ascending perennial herb up to 40 cm (16 in) tall, with many wiry, reddish or brownish branches. The leaves are arranged on the stems and are linear to needle-shaped, 40–100 mm (1.6–3.9 in) long, about 1 mm (0.039 in) wide and curved. The flowers are arranged in racemes up to 150 mm (5.9 in) long with leaf-like bracts, each flower on a pedicel 8–30 mm (0.31–1.18 in) long. The sepals are lance-shaped to narrow elliptic, 1.5–3 mm (0.059–0.118 in) long, the petals yellow with a brownish centre, 10–12 mm (0.39–0.47 in) long. The lower lobes of the corolla are 4–5 mm (0.16–0.20 in) long with wings 0.5–1.8 mm (0.020–0.071 in) wide. Flowering occurs from April to October and the fruit is a spherical to oval capsule about 6 mm (0.24 in) in diameter.

== Taxonomy and naming ==
Goodenia triodiophila was first formally described in 1980 by Roger Charles Carolin in the journal Telopea from material he collected near Tom Price in 1970. The specific epithet (triodiophila) refers to species' often growing between Triodia hummocks.

== Distribution and habitat ==
This goodenia grows on sandplains and rocky hills in arid regions of inland Western Australia, South Australia, the Northern Territory and western Queensland.

== Conservation status ==
Goodenia triodiophila is classified as "not threatened" by the Government of Western Australia Department of Parks and Wildlife and as of "least concern" under the Northern Territory Government Territory Parks and Wildlife Conservation Act 1976 and the Queensland Nature Conservation Act 1992.
