= Acacia exigua =

Muntalkura wattle

Scientific classification
- Kingdom: Plantae
- Clade: Tracheophytes
- Clade: Angiosperms
- Clade: Eudicots
- Clade: Rosids
- Order: Fabales
- Family: Fabaceae
- Subfamily: Caesalpinioideae
- Clade: Mimosoid clade
- Genus: Acacia
- Species: A. exigua

Binomial name
- Acacia exigua I.M.Turner

Synonyms
- Acacia exilis Maslin nom. illeg.; Racosperma exile Pedley

Species of legume

Acacia exigua, commonly known as muntalkura wattle, and as jonanyong or jananyung by the Kurrama people, is a species of flowering plant in the family Fabaceae and is endemic to northern Western Australia. It is a shrub or tree with fibrous grey bark, thread-like, slightly curved to s-shaped phyllodes, spikes of light golden yellow flowers and linear, firmly papery pods.

== Description ==
Acacia exigua is a shrub or small tree that typically grows to a height of 3–6 m (9.8–19.7 ft) and normally has a dense crown. It has fibrous grey bark and ribbed, terete and glabrous branchlets. The phyllodes are thread-like, slightly curved to slightly s-shaped, 10–180 mm (0.39–7.09 in) long and about 1 mm (0.039 in) in diameter and finely striated with a delicately curved to hook-shaped tip. The flowers are light golden yellow and borne in two spikes 10–20 mm (0.39–0.79 in) long in axils on a peduncle 8–13 mm (0.31–0.51 in) long. Flowering mostly occurs between May and July, and the pods are linear, shallowly curved, firmly papery, up to 90 mm (3.5 in) long and 4–5 mm (0.16–0.20 in) wide, greyish brown, constricted between and slightly raised over the seeds The seeds are oblong to elliptic, 4–5 mm (0.16–0.20 in) long, slightly shiny brown with a whitish aril on the end.

== Taxonomy ==
Acacia exigua was first formally described in 2014 by Ian Mark Turner in Annales Botanici Fennici, replacing Acacia exilis Maslin, an illegitimate name, because it was a homonym of a fossil species. The specific epithet (exigua) means 'small or feeble', referring to the phyllodes.

== Distribution and habitat ==
Muntalkura wattle grows on low, rocky hills in iron-rich soils and is confined to the Hamersley Range between Hamersley Station and south-east to Coppin Pool, in the Gascoyne and Pilbara bioregions of northern Western Australia.

== See also ==
- List of Acacia species
