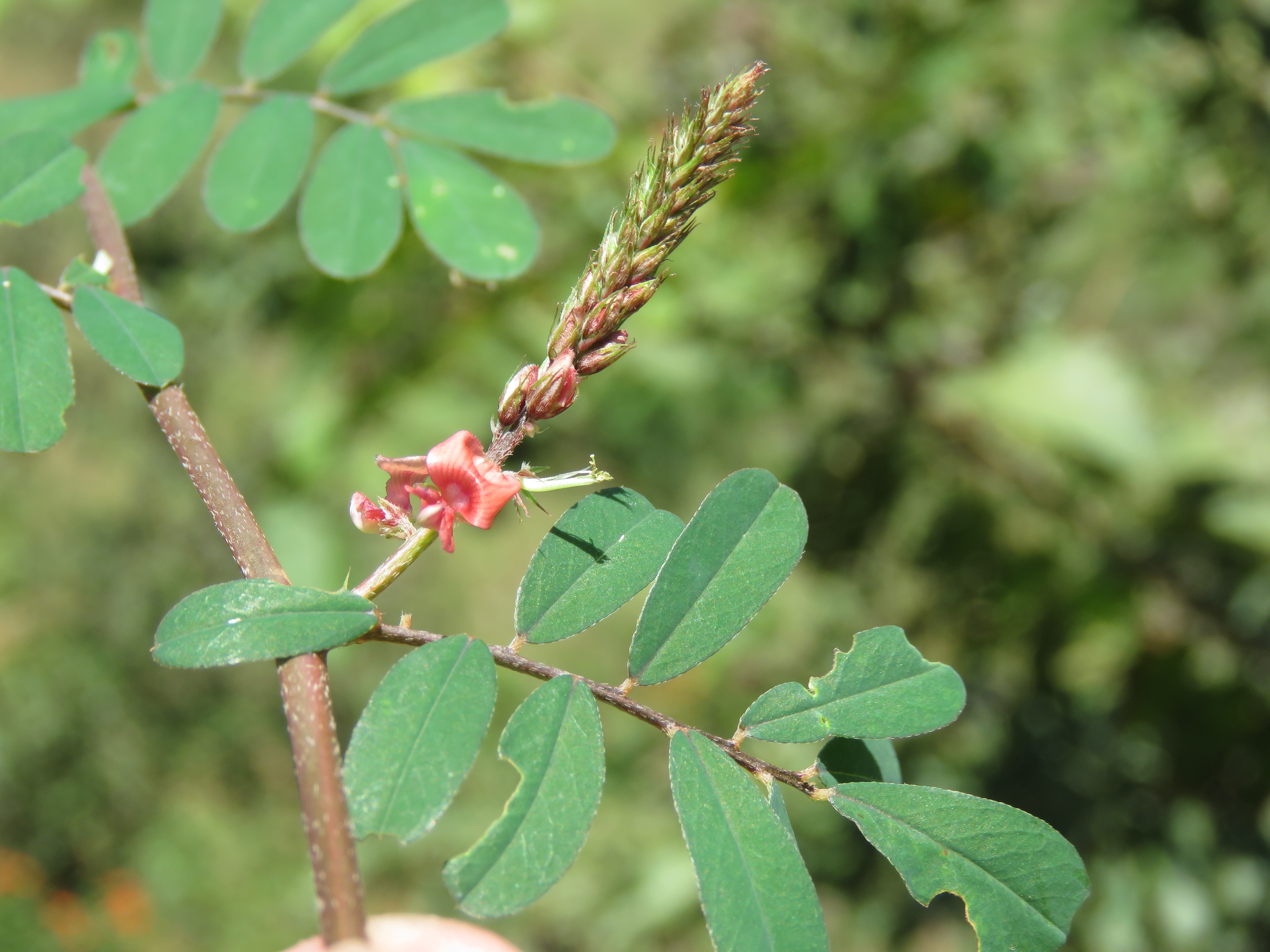
- Inflorescence and foliage, with tip of human finger showing scale
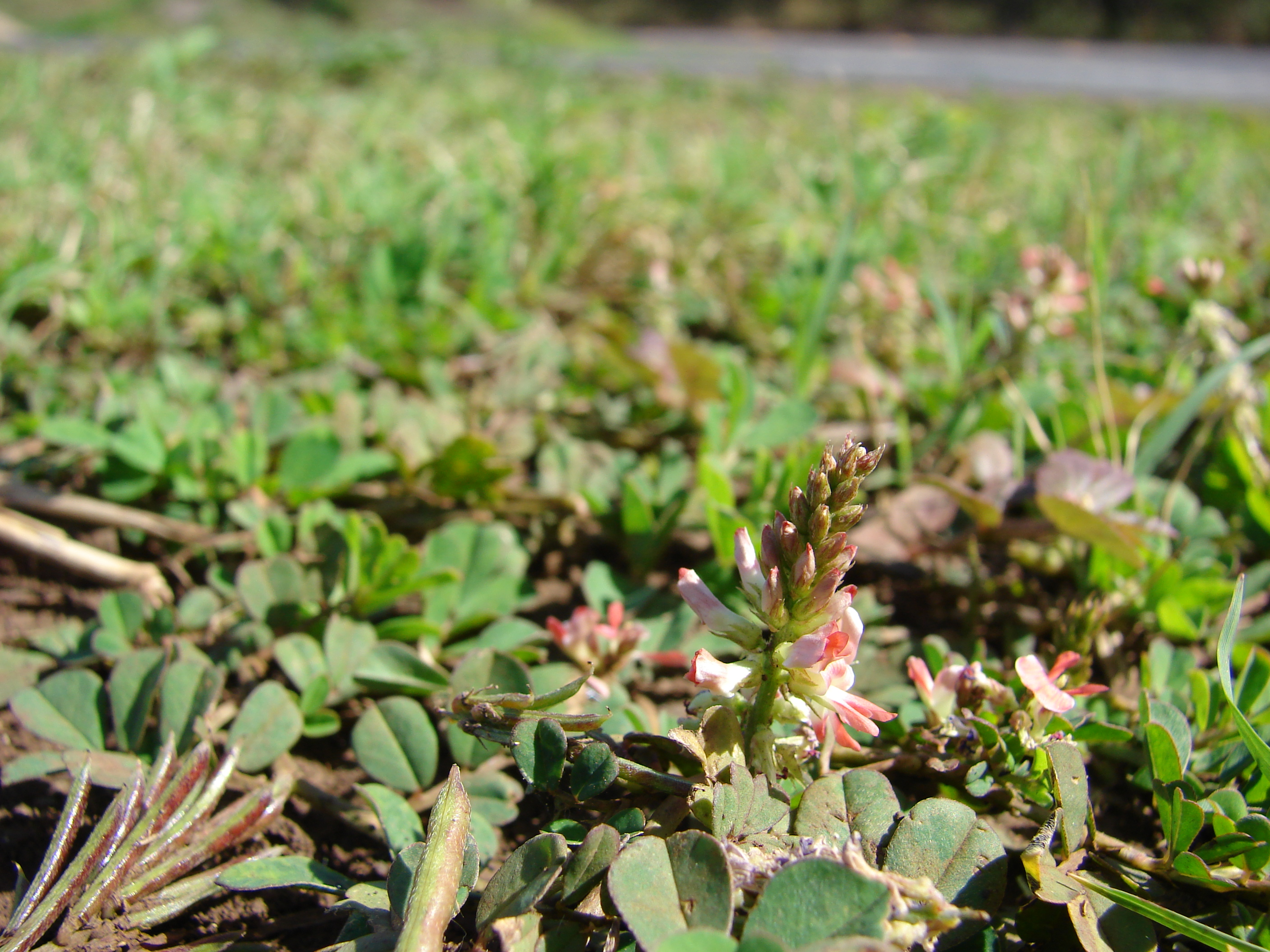
- Spreading in a macadamia nut orchard in Hawaii

Scientific classification
- Kingdom: Plantae
- Clade: Embryophytes
- Clade: Tracheophytes
- Clade: Spermatophytes
- Clade: Angiosperms
- Clade: Eudicots
- Clade: Rosids
- Order: Fabales
- Family: Fabaceae
- Subfamily: Faboideae
- Genus: Indigofera
- Species: I. hendecaphylla

Binomial name
- Indigofera hendecaphylla Jacq.

Synonyms
- List: Indigofera anceps Vahl ex Poir.; Indigofera bolusii N.E.Br.; Indigofera celebica Miq.; Indigofera endecaphylla Jacq.; Indigofera kleinii Wight & Arn.; Indigofera onobrychioides Baill.; Indigofera pectinata Baker; Indigofera prostrata Klein ex Wight & Arn.

= Indigofera hendecaphylla =

Species of flowering plant

Indigofera hendecaphylla, the creeping indigo or trailing indigo, is a species of flowering plant in the family Fabaceae. It is native to the Old World tropics and subtropics, and has been introduced to various locales, including Japan and Australia. It was widely introduced as a forage plant when it was thought to be conspecific with Indigofera spicata, and then shown to be toxic to nearly all livestock, with some uncertainty as to which species was tested.

== Subtaxa ==
The following varieties are accepted:

- Indigofera hendecaphylla var. hendecaphylla
