= Dragon Tree Soak Nature Reserve =

Nature reserve in Western Australia

- IUCN category Ia (strict nature reserve)
- Location within Western Australia
- Location: Western Australia
- Coordinates: 19°41′S 123°20′E
- Area: 17,733 ha (68.47 sq mi)
- Established: 1979
- Governing body: Department of Biodiversity, Conservation and Attractions

Dragon Tree Soak Nature Reserve is located in the Great Sandy Desert in the southern part of the Kimberley region of Western Australia.

It covers an area of around 180 square kilometres (69 sq mi) and is 210 kilometres (130 mi) east of the Great Northern Highway.

Dragon Tree Soak is a swamp believed to be a relic of the riverine vegetation found along the Mandora Palaeoriver during its partial rejuvenation by the wetter climates of the early to mid Holocene Epoch.

It is used by birds from the surrounding hummock grasslands but also has species generally associated with scrub or tree-lined watercourses elsewhere. Species not recorded elsewhere in the region but present in the Typha beds were the Clamorous Reed-Warbler and the Australian crake.

It is a wetland of significance, described as:

Dragon Tree Soak is a swamp with bullrush Typha domingensis and dragon tree Sesbania formosa. It includes a freshwater spring, a permanent freshwater marsh and peatland. It has an area of 5 ha (main water area: 1 ha). It forms an oasis supporting plants and animals that are absent or scarce elsewhere in the desert.

Wild camel damage has been reported as extensive, and programmes to reduce their effect on the reserve have been conducted.

== Assessability ==
It is a reserve that contains old dry lake beds, and is well away from named tracks. It is accessible by driving east following the track at 19°41'54.6"S 121°14'19.9"E, near Eighty Mile Beach, until 20°03'52.9"S 123°18'37.0"E, then heading north by 37 km. Flying by helicopter from Broome or Port Hedland is also possible.
