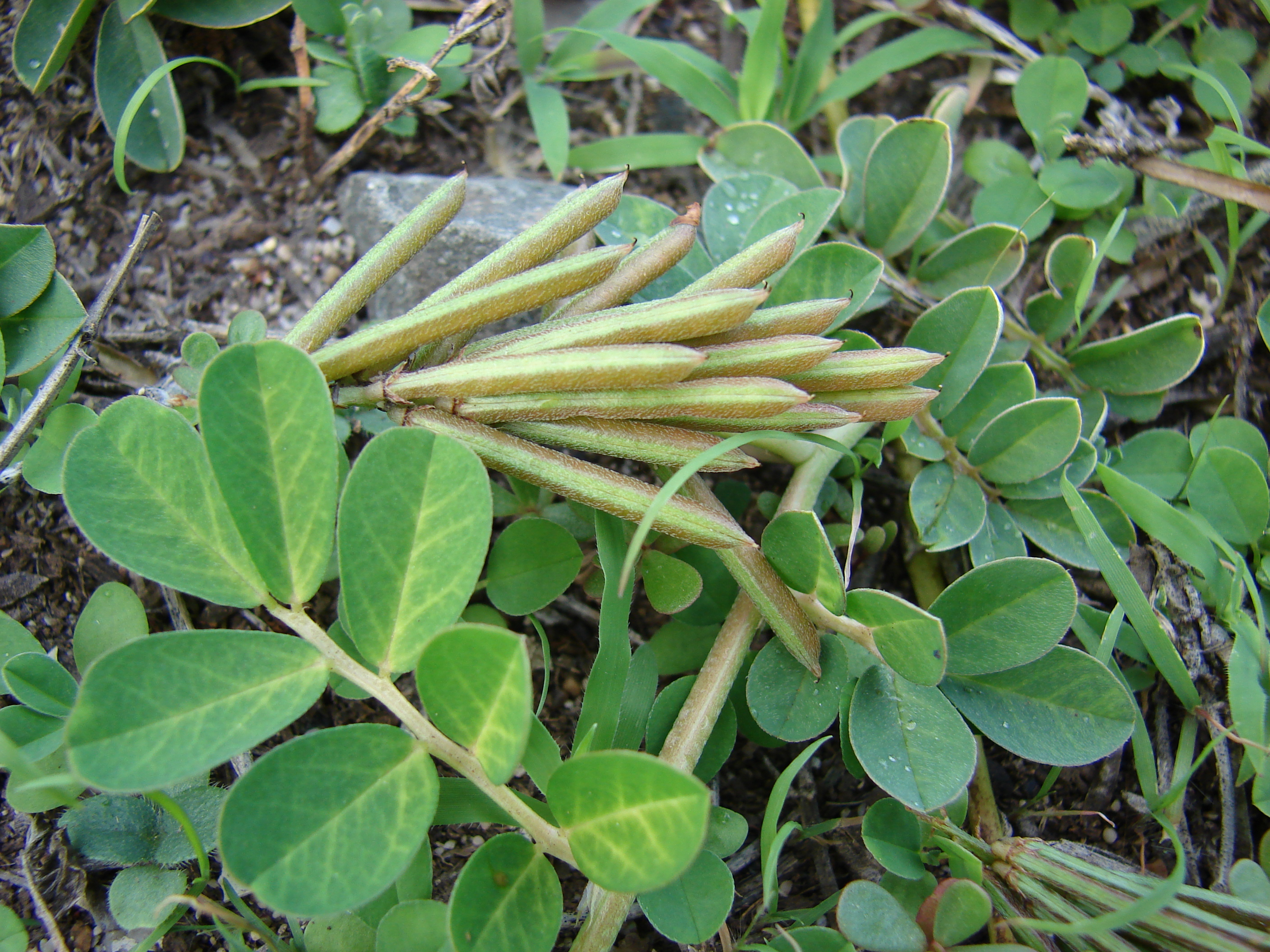
- Seedpods and foliage
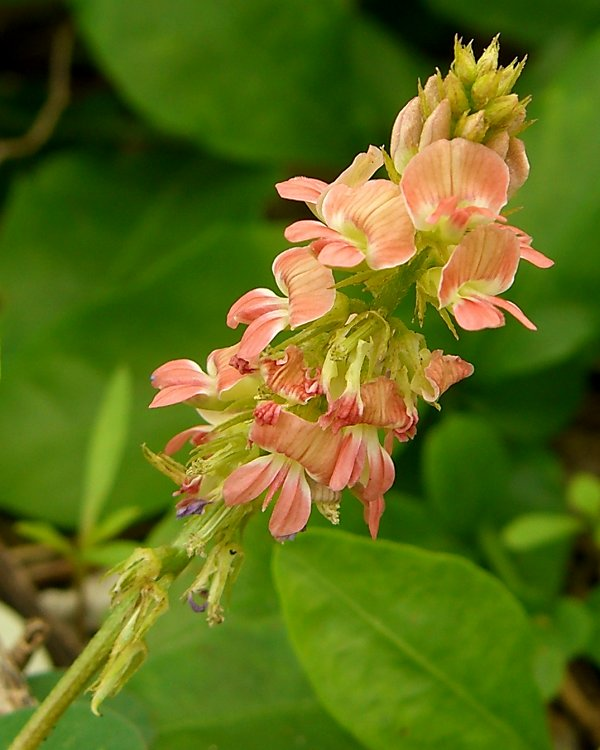
- Inflorescence

Scientific classification
- Kingdom: Plantae
- Clade: Embryophytes
- Clade: Tracheophytes
- Clade: Spermatophytes
- Clade: Angiosperms
- Clade: Eudicots
- Clade: Rosids
- Order: Fabales
- Family: Fabaceae
- Subfamily: Faboideae
- Genus: Indigofera
- Species: I. spicata

Binomial name
- Indigofera spicata Forssk.

Synonyms
- Indigofera parkeri Baker; Indigofera parvula Delile; Indigofera schimperiana Hochst.

= Indigofera spicata =

Species of flowering plant

Indigofera spicata, the creeping indigo or trailing indigo, is a species of flowering plant in the family Fabaceae. It is native to Sub‑Saharan Africa, Madagascar, Mauritius, Réunion, and Yemen, and has been introduced to the southeastern United States, various Caribbean islands, Brazil and other locations in Latin America, various Pacific islands, and New South Wales and Queensland in Australia. It was considered to be a promising forage plant, and then shown to be toxic to nearly all livestock, but it is possible that the experiments were conducted on the similar Indigofera hendecaphylla, leading to some confusion.

== Subtaxa ==
The following varieties are accepted:

- Indigofera spicata var. spicata
