= Acacia amentifera =

Scientific classification
- Kingdom: Plantae
- Clade: Tracheophytes
- Clade: Angiosperms
- Clade: Eudicots
- Clade: Rosids
- Order: Fabales
- Family: Fabaceae
- Subfamily: Caesalpinioideae
- Clade: Mimosoid clade
- Genus: Acacia
- Species: A. amentifera

Binomial name
- Acacia amentifera F.Muell.

Species of legume

Acacia amentifera is a species of flowering plant in the family Fabaceae and is endemic to a very restricted part of the Northern Territory. It is a shrub with clusters of oblong to lance-shaped phyllodes with the narrower end towards the base, flowers arranged in spikes of golden yellow flowers, and linear pods 47 mm (1.9 in) long.

== Description ==
Acacia amentifera is a shrub which grows to a height of up to 3 m (9.8 ft) and has arching branchlets. Its phyllodes are arranged in clusters of usually 3 to 5 in nodes, oblong and curved upwards, 6–11 mm (0.24–0.43 in) long and 1–2.5 mm (0.039–0.098 in) wide and finely wrinkled. The flowers are golden yellow and arranged in spikes 5–10 mm (0.20–0.39 in) long. Flowering has been observed in January and October and the fruit is a more or less linear pod up to 47 mm (1.9 in) long and about 4 mm (0.16 in) wide.

== Taxonomy ==
Acacia amentifera was first formally described in 1859 by Ferdinand von Mueller in the Journal and Proceedings of the Linnean Society, Botany.

== Distribution and habitat ==
This Acacia species grows on sandstone pavement in the Northern Territory, and was previously only known from the type, but was rediscovered in October 2018 in Jasper Gorge.

== See also ==
- List of Acacia species
