= Annales Botanici Fennici =

- Discipline: Botany
- Language: English
- Edited by: Johannes Enroth

Publication details
- History: 1964–present
- Publisher: Finnish Zoological and Botanical Publishing Board
- Frequency: Bimonthly
- Impact factor: 0.6 (2023)

Standard abbreviations
- ISO 4: Ann. Bot. Fenn.

Indexing
- ISSN: 0003-3847 (print); 1797-2442 (web)
- OCLC no.: 564763289

Annales Botanici Fennici is a bimonthly peer-reviewed scientific journal covering fungi and plant systematics, taxonomy, and nomenclature. The journal also accepts articles on population biology, physiology, molecular biology, climate change, ecology and invasive species, phytogeography, and paleoecology.

== History ==
The journal was established by the Societas Biologica Fennica Vanamo in 1964. It replaced two previous series, which had been in circulation from 1923 to 1963, called Annales Botanici Societatis Zoologicae Fennicae Vanamo and Archivum Societatis Zoologicae Fennicae Vanamo. The former ran for 35 volumes, while the latter ran for 18. The first editor-in-chief was Rauno Ruuhijärvi.

From 1978 to 1994, it was published by the Finnish Botanical Publishing Board. In 1980, the journal Acta Botanica Fennica was split off from the Annales. The purpose of it was to print longer, more comprehensive monographs at least 64 pages long, which did not fit into the short quarterly format of the Annales. Acta was in print until 2009.

The Finnish Botanical Publishing Board became the Finnish Zoological and Botanical Publishing Board in 1994 and has continued to publish the journal since then. The Finnish Ministry of Education and Culture now sponsor the journal.

Beginning in 2022, the journal moved to an online-only format starting with its 59th volume.
