= John Richard Maconochie =

Australian botanist (1941–1984)

John Richard Maconochie (13 June 1941 — 24 January 1984) was a botanist from Australia. He collected Acacia.

Maconochie was born in Adelaide. He was in charge of the herbarium in Alice Springs from 1967 until 1984.

He helped establish the National Herbarium of Oman. Plant specimens he collected are also at the Northern Territory Herbarium.

Cycas maconochiei is named for him and Maconochie Road in the Desert Springs suburb of Alice Springs was gazetted 17 September 1987 and dedicated to "the town's longest serving botanist".

Acacia maconochieana also commemorates him as "a knowledgeable botanist and a good companion.

He died in a traffic accident in Somalia.
