= List of Eucalyptus species =

The following is an alphabetical list of Eucalyptus species accepted by the Australian Plant Census as at February 2019. Eucalyptus aenea is also an accepted species by Plants of the World Online. Several species only occurring outside Australia, including E. orophila, E. urophylla and E. wetarensis are listed at Plants of the World Online.

== A ==
- Eucalyptus abdita Brooker & Hopper
- Eucalyptus absita Grayling & Brooker – Badgingarra box
- Eucalyptus acaciiformis H.Deane & Maiden – wattle-leaved peppermint
- Eucalyptus accedens W.Fitzg. – powderbark wandoo
- Eucalyptus acies Brooker – Woolburnup mallee
- Eucalyptus acmenoides Schauer in W.G.Walpers – white mahogany
- Eucalyptus acroleuca L.A.S.Johnson & K.D.Hill – Lakefield coolibah
- Eucalyptus adesmophloia (Brooker & Hopper) D.Nicolle & M.E.French
- Eucalyptus aequioperta Brooker & Hopper – Welcome Hill gum
- Eucalyptus agglomerata Maiden – blue-leaved stringybark
- Eucalyptus aggregata H.Deane & Maiden – black gum
- Eucalyptus alaticaulis R.J.Watson & Ladiges - Grampians grey-gum
- Eucalyptus alatissima (Brooker & Hopper) D. Nicolle
- Eucalyptus alba ex Blume – poplar gum
  - Eucalyptus alba var. australasica Blakely & Jacobs
- Eucalyptus albens Benth. – white box
- Eucalyptus albida Maiden & Blakely – white-leaved mallee
- Eucalyptus albopurpurea (Boomsma) D.Nicolle – purple-flowered mallee
- Eucalyptus alipes (L.A.S.Johnson & K.D.Hill) D.Nicolle & Brooker
- Eucalyptus alligatrix L.A.S.Johnson & K.D.Hill - silver stringybark
  - Eucalyptus alligatrix subsp. alligatrix
  - Eucalyptus alligatrix subsp. limaensis Brooker, Slee & J.D.Briggs – Lima stringybark
  - Eucalyptus alligatrix subsp. miscella Brooker, Slee & J.D.Briggs,
- Eucalyptus × alpina Lindl. – Grampians gum
- Eucalyptus ammophila Brooker & Slee – sandplain red gum
- Eucalyptus amplifolia Naudin – cabbage gum
  - Eucalyptus amplifolia subsp. amplifolia
  - Eucalyptus amplifolia subsp. sessiliflora (Blakely) L.A.S.Johnson & K.D.Hill
- Eucalyptus amygdalina Labill. – black peppermint
- Eucalyptus ancophila L.A.S.Johnson & K.D.Hill
- Eucalyptus andrewsii Maiden – New England blackbutt
- Eucalyptus angophoroides R.T.Baker – apple-topped box
- Eucalyptus angularis Brooker & Hopper – Lesueur phantom mallee
- Eucalyptus angulosa Schauer in W.G.Walpers – ridge fruited mallee
- Eucalyptus angustissima F.Muell. – narrow-leaved mallee
- Eucalyptus annettae D.Nicolle & M.E.French
- Eucalyptus annulata Benth. – open-fruited mallee
- Eucalyptus annuliformis Grayling & Brooker – Badgerabbie mallee
- Eucalyptus apiculata R.T.Baker & H.G.Sm. – narrow-leaved mallee ash
- Eucalyptus apodophylla Blakely & Jacobs in W.F.Blakely – whitebark
- Eucalyptus apothalassica L.A.S.Johnson & K.D.Hill – inland white mahogany
- Eucalyptus approximans Maiden – Barren Mountain mallee
- Eucalyptus aquatica (Blakely) L.A.S.Johnson & K.D.Hill – mountain swamp gum
- Eucalyptus aquilina Brooker – Mount Le Grand mallee
- Eucalyptus arachnaea Brooker & Hopper – black-stemmed mallee
  - Eucalyptus arachnaea subsp. arachnaea
  - Eucalyptus arachnaea subsp. arrecta Brooker & Hopper
- Eucalyptus arborella Brooker & Hopper – Twertup mallet
- Eucalyptus arcana (D.Nicolle & Brooker) Rule – mallee manna gum
- Eucalyptus archeri Maiden & Blakely in J.H.Maiden – alpine cider gum
- Eucalyptus arenacea Marginson & Ladiges – desert stringybark
- Eucalyptus arenicola Rule – Holey Plains peppermint
- Eucalyptus argillacea W.Fitzg. – Mount House box
- Eucalyptus argophloia Blakely – Queensland white gum
- Eucalyptus argutifolia Grayling & Brooker – Wabling Hill mallee
- Eucalyptus aridimontana D.Nicolle & M.E.French
- Eucalyptus armillata D.Nicolle & M.E.French – red-flowered mallee
- Eucalyptus aromaphloia Pryor & J.H.Willis – Creswick apple-box
- Eucalyptus articulata Brooker & Hopper – Ponton Creek mallee
- Eucalyptus aspersa Brooker & Hopper
- Eucalyptus aspratilis L.A.S.Johnson & K.D.Hill – soak yate
- Eucalyptus assimilans L.A.S.Johnson & K.D.Hill
- Eucalyptus astringens (Maiden) Maiden – brown mallet
  - Eucalyptus astringens subsp. astringens
  - Eucalyptus astringens subsp. redacta Brooker & Hopper
- Eucalyptus atrata L.A.S.Johnson & K.D.Hill – Herberton ironbark
- Eucalyptus aurifodina Rule – small-leaved brown stringybark

== B ==
- Eucalyptus badjensis Beuzev. & M.B.Welch – Big Badja gum
- Eucalyptus baeuerlenii F.Muell. – Baeuerlen's gum
- Eucalyptus baileyana F.Muell. – Bailey's stringybark
- Eucalyptus baiophylla D.Nicolle & Brooker
- Eucalyptus bakeri Maiden – Baker's mallee
- Eucalyptus × balanites Grayling & Brooker Cadda Road mallee
- Eucalyptus × balanopelex L.A.S.Johnson & K.D.Hill
- Eucalyptus balladoniensis Brooker – Balladonia mallee
  - Eucalyptus balladoniensis subsp. balladoniensis
  - Eucalyptus balladoniensis subsp. sedens L.A.S.Johnson & K.D.Hill
- Eucalyptus bancroftii (Maiden) Maiden – orange gum
- Eucalyptus banksii Maiden – Tenterfield woollybutt
- Eucalyptus barberi L.A.S.Johnson & Blaxell – Barber's gum
- Eucalyptus baudiniana D.J.Carr & S.G.M.Carr
- Eucalyptus baueriana Schauer in W.G.Walpers – blue box
  - Eucalyptus baueriana subsp. baueriana
  - Eucalyptus baueriana subsp. deddickensis Rule
  - Eucalyptus baueriana subsp. thalassina Rule – Werribee blue box
- Eucalyptus baxteri (Benth.) Maiden & Blakely ex J.M.Black – brown stringybark
- Eucalyptus beaniana L.A.S.Johnson & K.D.Hill – Bean's ironbark
- Eucalyptus beardiana Brooker & Blaxell – Beard's mallee
- Eucalyptus behriana F.Muell. – bull mallee
- Eucalyptus bensonii L.A.S.Johnson & K.D.Hill – Benson's stringybark
- Eucalyptus benthamii Maiden & Cambage – Camden white gum
- Eucalyptus × beyeri R.T.Baker
- Eucalyptus beyeriana L.A.S.Johnson & K.D.Hill – Beyer's ironbark
- Eucalyptus bigalerita F.Muell. – northern salmon gum
- Eucalyptus blakelyi Maiden – Blakely's redgum
- Eucalyptus blaxellii L.A.S.Johnson & K.D.Hill – Howatharra mallee
- Eucalyptus blaxlandii Maiden & Cambage – Blaxland's stringybark
- Eucalyptus boliviana J.B.Williams & K.D.Hill – Bolivia Hill stringybark
- Eucalyptus bosistoana F.Muell. – coast grey box, Gippsland grey box
- Eucalyptus botryoides Sm. – southern mahogany
- Eucalyptus brachyandra F.Muell. – tropical red box
- Eucalyptus brachycalyx Blakely – gilja, Chindoo mallee
- Eucalyptus × brachyphylla C.A.Gardner
- Eucalyptus brandiana Hopper & McQuoid
- Eucalyptus brassiana S.T.Blake – Cape York red gum, gum-topped peppermint
- Eucalyptus brevifolia F.Muell. – northern white gum, snappy gum
- Eucalyptus brevipes Brooker – Mukinbudin mallee
- Eucalyptus brevistylis Brooker – Rate's tingle
- Eucalyptus bridgesiana R.T.Baker – apple box, apple, apple gum
- Eucalyptus brockwayi C.A.Gardner – Dundas mahogany
- Eucalyptus brookeriana A.M.Gray – Brooker's gum
- Eucalyptus broviniensis A.R.Bean
- Eucalyptus brownii Maiden & Cambage – Brown's box, Reid River box
- Eucalyptus bunyip Rule
- Eucalyptus buprestium F.Muell. – apple mallee, ball-fruited mallee
- Eucalyptus burdettiana Blakely & H.Steedman – Burdett's mallee
- Eucalyptus burgessiana L.A.S.Johnson & Blaxell – Faulconbridge mallee ash
- Eucalyptus burracoppinensis Maiden & Blakely – Burracoppin mallee

== C ==
- Eucalyptus cadens J.D.Briggs & Crisp – tumble-down swamp gum, Warby Range swamp-gum
- Eucalyptus caesia Benth. – caesia
- Eucalyptus cajuputea Miq. – narrow-leaved peppermint box
- Eucalyptus calcareana Boomsma – Nundroo mallee, Nundroo gum
- Eucalyptus calcicola Brooker – Boranup mallee, Harry Butler's mallee or Hamelin Bay mallee
  - Eucalyptus calcicola subsp. calcicola
  - Eucalyptus calcicola subsp. unita D.Nicolle
- Eucalyptus caleyi Maiden – Caley's ironbark
  - Eucalyptus caleyi subsp. caleyi
  - Eucalyptus caleyi subsp. ovendenii L.A.S.Johnson & K.D.Hill
- Eucalyptus caliginosa Blakely & McKie in W.F.Blakely – broad-leaved stringybark, New England stringybark
- Eucalyptus calycogona Turcz. - gooseberry mallee, square-fruited mallee
  - Eucalyptus calycogona subsp. calycogona
  - Eucalyptus calycogona subsp. miraculum D.Nicolle & M.E.French
  - Eucalyptus calycogona subsp. spaffordii D.Nicolle
  - Eucalyptus calycogona subsp. trachybasis D.Nicolle
- Eucalyptus calyerup McQuoid & Hopper
- Eucalyptus camaldulensis Dehnh. – river red gum
  - Eucalyptus camaldulensis subsp. acuta Brooker & M.W.McDonald
  - Eucalyptus camaldulensis subsp. arida Brooker & M.W.McDonald
  - Eucalyptus camaldulensis Dehnh. subsp. camaldulensis
  - Eucalyptus camaldulensis subsp. minima Brooker & M.W.McDonald
  - Eucalyptus camaldulensis subsp. obtusa (Blakely) Brooker & M.W.McDonald
  - Eucalyptus camaldulensis subsp. refulgens Brooker & M.W.McDonald
  - Eucalyptus camaldulensis subsp. simulata Brooker & Kleinig
- Eucalyptus cambageana Maiden – Dawson River blackbutt, Coowarra box
- Eucalyptus cameronii Blakely & McKie in W.F.Blakely – diehard stringybark
- Eucalyptus camfieldii Maiden – Camfield's stringybark
- Eucalyptus campanulata R.T.Baker & H.G.Sm. – New England blackbutt
- Eucalyptus campaspe S.Moore – silver gimlet
- Eucalyptus camphora R.T.Baker – swamp gum
  - Eucalyptus camphora subsp. camphora
  - Eucalyptus camphora subsp. humeana L.A.S.Johnson & K.D.Hill
- Eucalyptus canaliculata Maiden – grey gum
- Eucalyptus canescens D.Nicolle – Ooldea Range mallee
  - Eucalyptus canescens subsp. beadellii Nicolle
  - Eucalyptus canescens subsp. canescens
- Eucalyptus canobolensis (L.A.S.Johnson & K.D.Hill) J.T.Hunter – Mount Canobolas candlebark
- Eucalyptus capillosa Brooker & Hopper – wheatbelt wandoo, mallee wandoo
  - Eucalyptus capillosa subsp. capillosa
  - Eucalyptus capillosa subsp. polyclada Brooker & Hopper
- Eucalyptus capitanea L.A.S.Johnson & K.D.Hill – desert ridge-fruited mallee
- Eucalyptus capitellata Sm. – brown stringybark
- Eucalyptus captiosa Brooker & Hopper
- Eucalyptus carnea R.T.Baker – thick leaved mahogany, broad-leaved mahogany
- Eucalyptus carnei C.A.Gardner – Carne's blackbutt
- Eucalyptus carolaniae Rule
- Eucalyptus castrensis K.D.Hill - Singleton mallee
- Eucalyptus celastroides Turcz. – mirret
  - Eucalyptus celastroides subsp. celastroides
  - Eucalyptus celastroides subsp. virella Brooker
- Eucalyptus cephalocarpa Blakely – mealy stringybark, silver stringybark
- Eucalyptus ceracea Brooker & Done – Seppelt Range gum
- Eucalyptus cerasiformis Brooker & Blaxell – cherry-fruited mallee
- Eucalyptus ceratocorys (Blakely) L.A.S.Johnson & K.D.Hill – horn-capped mallee
- Eucalyptus cernua Brooker & Hopper – red-flowered or yellow-flowered mort
- Eucalyptus chapmaniana Cameron – Bogong gum
- Eucalyptus chartaboma D.Nicolle – paperbark gum
- Eucalyptus chloroclada (Blakely) L.A.S.Johnson & K.D.Hill – Baradine gum, red gum or dirty gum
- Eucalyptus chlorophylla Brooker & Done - green-leaf box, glossy-leaved box
- Eucalyptus × chrysantha Blakely & H.Steedman
- Eucalyptus cinerea F.Muell. ex Benth. - Argyle apple, mealy stringybark
  - Eucalyptus cinerea subsp. cinerea
  - Eucalyptus cinerea subsp. triplex (L.A.S.Johnson & K.D.Hill) Brooker, Slee & J.D.Briggs
- Eucalyptus cladocalyx F.Muell. – sugar gum
  - Eucalyptus cladocalyx subsp. crassaD.Nicholle
  - Eucalyptus cladocalyx subsp. petilaD.Nicholle
- Eucalyptus clelandiorum (Maiden) Maiden – Cleland's blackbutt
- Eucalyptus clivicola Brooker & Hopper – green mallet
- Eucalyptus cloeziana F.Muell. Gympie messmate, dead finish
- Eucalyptus cneorifolia A.Cunn. ex DC. – Kangaroo Island narrow-leaf mallee
- Eucalyptus coccifera Hook.f. – Tasmanian snow gum
- Eucalyptus codonocarpa Blakely & McKie – bell-fruited mallee ash, New England mallee ash
- Eucalyptus comitae-vallis Maiden – Comet Vale mallee
- Eucalyptus concinna Maiden & Blakely in J.H.Maiden – Victoria Desert Mallee
- Eucalyptus conferruminata D.J.Carr & S.G.M.Carr – Bald Island marlock, bushy yate
  - Eucalyptus conferruminata subsp. conferruminata
  - Eucalyptus conferruminata subsp. recherche D.Nicolle & M.E.French
- Eucalyptus conferta Rule
- Eucalyptus confluens W.Fitzg. ex Maiden – Kimberley gum
- Eucalyptus conglobata (Benth.) Maiden – cong mallee, Port Lincoln mallee
  - Eucalyptus conglobata subsp. conglobata
  - Eucalyptus conglobata subsp. perata Brooker & Slee
- Eucalyptus conglomerata Maiden & Blakely in J.H.Maiden – swamp stringybark
- Eucalyptus conica H.Deane & Maiden – fuzzy box
- Eucalyptus × conjuncta L.A.S.Johnson & K.D.Hill
- Eucalyptus consideniana Maiden – yertchuk
- Eucalyptus conspicua L.A.S.Johnson & K.D.Hill – Gippsland swamp-box
- Eucalyptus conveniens L.A.S.Johnson & K.D.Hill
- Eucalyptus coolabah Blakely & Jacobs in W.F.Blakely - coolabah, coolibah
- Eucalyptus cooperiana F.Muell. – many-flowered mallee
- Eucalyptus copulans L.A.S.Johnson & K.D.Hill
- Eucalyptus cordata Labill. – heart-leaved silver gum
  - Eucalyptus cordata subsp. cordata
  - Eucalyptus cordata subsp. quadrangulosa D.Nicolle, B.M.Potts & McKinnon
- Eucalyptus cornuta Labill. – yate
- Eucalyptus coronata C.A.Gardner – crowned mallee
- Eucalyptus corrugata Luehm. – rough fruited mallee, rib-fruited mallee
- Eucalyptus corticosa L.A.S.Johnson – Creswick apple-box, Olinda box
- Eucalyptus corynodes A.R.Bean & Brooker
- Eucalyptus cosmophylla F.Muell. – cup gum, bog gum or scrub gum
- Eucalyptus costuligera L.A.S.Johnson & K.D.Hill
- Eucalyptus crebra F.Muell. – narrow-leaved ironbark, narrow-leaved red ironbark, muggago
- Eucalyptus crenulata Blakely & Beuzev. – Buxton gum, Victorian silver gum
- Eucalyptus creta L.A.S.Johnson & K.D.Hill – large-fruited gimlet
- Eucalyptus cretata P.J.Lang & Brooker – Darke Peak mallee
- Eucalyptus crispata Brooker & Hopper – Yandanooka mallee
- Eucalyptus croajingolensis L.A.S.Johnson & K.D.Hill – East Gippsland peppermint
- Eucalyptus crucis Maiden
  - Eucalyptus crucis subsp. crucis – silver mallee
  - Eucalyptus crucis subsp. lanceolata Brooker & Hopper – narrow-leaved silver mallee
  - Eucalyptus crucis subsp. praecipua Brooker & Hopper – Paynes Find mallee
- Eucalyptus cullenii Cambage – Cullen's ironbark
- Eucalyptus cunninghamii Sweet – cliff mallee ash
- Eucalyptus cuprea Brooker & Hopper – mallee box
- Eucalyptus cupularis C.A.Gardner – Halls Creek white gum, wawulinggi
- Eucalyptus curtisii Blakely & C.T.White – Plunkett mallee
- Eucalyptus cuspidata Turcz.
- Eucalyptus cyanophylla Brooker – Murraylands mallee, blue-leaved mallee, ghost mallee
- Eucalyptus cyclostoma Brooker
- Eucalyptus cylindriflora Maiden & Blakely – white mallee
- Eucalyptus cylindrocarpa Blakely – woodline mallee
- Eucalyptus cypellocarpa L.A.S.Johnson – mountain grey gum, monkey gum, spotted mountain grey gum

== D ==
- Eucalyptus dalrympleana Maiden – mountain gum, mountain white gum, broad-leaved ribbon gum
  - Eucalyptus dalrympleana subsp. dalrympleana
  - Eucalyptus dalrympleana subsp. heptantha L.A.S.Johnson
- Eucalyptus dawsonii R.T.Baker – slaty gum, slaty box,
- Eucalyptus dealbata A.Cunn. ex Schauer in W.G.Walpers – tumbledown red gum, hill redgum
- Eucalyptus deanei Maiden – mountain blue gum, round-leaved gum
- Eucalyptus decipiens Endl. – redheart, redheart moit
- Eucalyptus decolor A.R.Bean & Brooker
- Eucalyptus decorticans (F.M.Bailey) Maiden – gum-top ironbark
- Eucalyptus decurva F.Muell. – slender mallee
- Eucalyptus deflexa Brooker – Lake King mallee
- Eucalyptus deglupta Blume (Indonesia, P.N.G.) – rainbow eucalyptus, Mindanao gum, rainbow gum
- Eucalyptus delegatensis F.Muell. ex R.T.Baker – alpine ash, gum-topped stringybark, white-top
  - Eucalyptus delegatensis subsp. delegatensis
  - Eucalyptus delegatensis subsp. tasmaniensis Boland
- Eucalyptus delicata L.A.S.Johnson & K.D.Hill
- Eucalyptus dendromorpha (Blakely) L.A.S.Johnson & Blaxell – Budawang ash, giant mallee ash
- Eucalyptus densa Brooker & Hopper
  - Eucalyptus densa subsp. densa
  - Eucalyptus densa subsp. improcera Brooker & Hopper
- Eucalyptus denticulata I.O.Cook & Ladiges – Errinundra shining gum, shining gum
- Eucalyptus depauperata L.A.S.Johnson & K.D.Hill
- Eucalyptus desmondensis Maiden & Blakely – Desmond mallee
- Eucalyptus deuaensis Boland & P.M.Gilmour – Mongamulla mallee
- Eucalyptus dielsii C.A.Gardner – cap-fruited mallee, cap-fruited mallet
- Eucalyptus diminuta Brooker & Hopper – spring mallee
- Eucalyptus diptera C.R.P.Andrews – two-winged gimlet
- Eucalyptus discreta Brooker
- Eucalyptus dissimulata Brooker – red-capped mallee
- Eucalyptus distans Brooker, Boland & Kleinig – Katherine box
- Eucalyptus distuberosa D.Nicolle
  - Eucalyptus distuberosa subsp. aerata D.Nicolle
  - Eucalyptus distuberosa subsp. distuberosa
- Eucalyptus diversicolor F.Muell. – karri
- Eucalyptus diversifolia Bonpl.
  - Eucalyptus diversifolia subsp. diversifolia – soap mallee, coastal white mallee, coast gum
  - Eucalyptus diversifolia subsp. hesperia I.J.Wright & Ladiges
- Eucalyptus dives Schauer in W.G.Walpers – broad-leaved peppermint, blue peppermint
- Eucalyptus dolichocera L.A.S.Johnson & K.D.Hill
- Eucalyptus dolichorhyncha (Brooker) Brooker & Hopper – fuchsia gum
- Eucalyptus dolorosa Brooker & Hopper – Mount Misery mallee, Dandaragan mallee
- Eucalyptus doratoxylon F.Muell. – spearwood mallee, spearwood, geitch-gmunt
- Eucalyptus dorrigoensis (Blakely) L.A.S.Johnson & K.D.Hill – Dorrigo white gum
- Eucalyptus drummondii Benth. – Drummond's gum, Drummond's mallee
- Eucalyptus dumosa A.Cunn. ex Oxley – white mallee, dumosa mallee, Congoo mallee
- Eucalyptus dundasii Maiden – Dundas blackbutt
- Eucalyptus dunnii Maiden - Dunn's white gum, white gum
- Eucalyptus dura L.A.S.Johnson & K.D.Hill
- Eucalyptus dwyeri Maiden & Blakely – Dwyer's red gum, Dwyer's mallee gum

== E ==
- Eucalyptus ebbanoensis Maiden – sandplain mallee
  - Eucalyptus ebbanoensis subsp. ebbanoensis
  - Eucalyptus ebbanoensis subsp. glauciramula L.A.S.Johnson & K.D.Hill
  - Eucalyptus ebbanoensis subsp. photina Brooker & Hopper
- Eucalyptus ecostata (Maiden) D.Nicolle & M.E.French – coastal silver mallee
- Eucalyptus educta L.A.S.Johnson & K.D.Hill
- Eucalyptus effusa Brooker – rough-barked gimlet
  - Eucalyptus effusa subsp. effusa
  - Eucalyptus effusa subsp. exsul L.A.S.Johnson & K.D.Hill
- Eucalyptus elaeophloia Chappill, Crisp & Prober – Nunniong gum, olive mallee
- Eucalyptus elata Dehnh. – river peppermint, river white gum
- Eucalyptus elegans A.R.Bean
- Eucalyptus elliptica (Blakely & McKie) L.A.S.Johnson & K.D.Hill – Bendemeer white gum
- Eucalyptus erectifolia Brooker & Hopper – Stirling Range mallee
- Eucalyptus eremicola Boomsma – Vokes Hill mallee
  - Eucalyptus eremicola subsp. eremicola
  - Eucalyptus eremicola subsp. peeneri (Blakely) D.Nicolle
- Eucalyptus eremophila (Diels) Maiden – sand mallet, tall sand mallee
  - Eucalyptus eremophila (Diels) Maiden subsp. eremophila (Blakely) D.Nicolle
  - Eucalyptus eremophila subsp. pterocarpa (Blakely & H.Steedman) L.A.S.Johnson & Blaxell
- Eucalyptus erosa A.R.Bean
- Eucalyptus erythrocorys F.Muell. – illyarrie, red-capped gum, helmet nut gum
- Eucalyptus erythronema Turcz. – red-flowered mallee
  - Eucalyptus erythronema Turcz. subsp. erythronema
  - Eucalyptus erythronema subsp. inornata D.Nicolle & M.E.French
- Eucalyptus eudesmioides F.Muell. – mallalie, desert gum, mallabie
- Eucalyptus eugenioides Sieber ex Spreng. – thin-leaved stringybark, white stringybark
- Eucalyptus ewartiana Maiden – Ewart's mallee
- Eucalyptus exigua Brooker & Hopper
- Eucalyptus exilipes Brooker & A.R.Bean – fine-leaved ironbark
- Eucalyptus exilis Brooker – Boyagin mallee
- Eucalyptus expressa S.A.J.Bell & D.Nicolle – Wollemi stringybark
- Eucalyptus exserta F.Muell. – Queensland peppermint, bendo, yellow messmate
- Eucalyptus extensa L.A.S.Johnson & K.D.Hill
- Eucalyptus extrica D.Nicolle – eastern tallerack

== F ==
- Eucalyptus falcata Turcz. – silver mallet, toolyumuck
- Eucalyptus falciformis (Newnham, Ladiges & Whiffin) Rule – Grampians peppermint, western peppermint
- Eucalyptus famelica Brooker & Hopper
- Eucalyptus farinosa K.D.Hill
- Eucalyptus fasciculosa F.Muell. – pink gum, hill gum, scrub gum
- Eucalyptus fastigata H.Deane & Maiden – brown barrel, cut-tail
- Eucalyptus fibrosa F.Muell. – red ironbark, broad-leaved red ironbark, broad-leaved red ironbark
  - Eucalyptus fibrosa subsp. fibrosa
  - Eucalyptus fibrosa subsp. nubila (Maiden & Blakely) L.A.S.Johnson – blue-leaved ironbark
- Eucalyptus filiformis Rule
- Eucalyptus fitzgeraldii Blakely – broad-leaved box, paper-barked box
- Eucalyptus flavida Brooker & Hopper – yellow-flowered mallee
- Eucalyptus flindersii Boomsma – South Australian grey mallee, mallee red gum, grey mallee
- Eucalyptus flocktoniae (Maiden) Maiden – merrit
  - Eucalyptus flocktoniae subsp. flocktoniae
  - Eucalyptus flocktoniae subsp. hebes D.Nicolle
- Eucalyptus foecunda Schauer in J.G.C.Lehmann – narrow-leaved red mallee, Fremantle mallee, coastal dune mallee
- Eucalyptus foliosa L.A.S.Johnson & K.D.Hill
- Eucalyptus formanii C.A.Gardner – Die Hardy mallee, Forman's mallee, feather gum
- Eucalyptus forresterae Molyneux & Rule – brumby sallee
- Eucalyptus forrestiana Diels – fuchsia gum, fuchsia mallee
- Eucalyptus fracta K.D.Hill
- Eucalyptus fraseri (Brooker) Brooker – Balladonia gum
  - Eucalyptus fraseri subsp. fraseri
  - Eucalyptus fraseri subsp. melanobasis L.A.S.Johnson & K.D.Hill
- Eucalyptus fraxinoides H.Deane & Maiden – white ash, white mountain ash
- Eucalyptus frenchiana D.Nicolle
- Eucalyptus froggattii Blakely – Kamarooka mallee
- Eucalyptus fruticosa Brooker
- Eucalyptus fulgens Rule – green scentbark
- Eucalyptus fusiformis Boland & Kleinig – grey ironbark, Nambucca ironbark

== G ==
- Eucalyptus gamophylla F.Muell. – warilu, blue-leaved mallee, twin-leaved mallee, blue mallee
- Eucalyptus gardneri Maiden – blue mallet, woacal
  - Eucalyptus gardneri subsp. gardneri
  - Eucalyptus gardneri subsp. ravensthorpensis Brooker & Hopper
- Eucalyptus georgei Brooker & Blaxell – Hyden blue gum
  - Eucalyptus georgei subsp. fulgida Brooker & Hopper
  - Eucalyptus georgei subsp. georgei
- Eucalyptus gigantangion L.A.S.Johnson & K.D.Hill – Kakadu woollybutt
- Eucalyptus gillenii Ewart & L.R.Kerr – mallee red gum, Mt Gillen mallee, Mt Lindsay mallee
- Eucalyptus gillii Maiden – curly mallee, Arkaroola mallee, silver mallee
- Eucalyptus gittinsii Brooker & Blaxell – northern sandplain mallee
  - Eucalyptus gittinsii subsp. gittinsii
  - Eucalyptus gittinsii subsp. illucida D.Nicolle
- Eucalyptus glaucescens Maiden & Blakely in J.H.Maiden – Tingiringi gum, Tingaringy gum
- Eucalyptus glaucina (Blakely) L.A.S.Johnson – slaty red gum
- Eucalyptus globoidea Blakely – white stringybark
- Eucalyptus globulus Labill.
  - Eucalyptus globulus subsp. bicostata (Maiden, Blakely & Simmonds) J.B.Kirkp. – southern blue gum, eurabbie, blue gum, Victorian blue gum
  - Eucalyptus globulus Labill. subsp. globulus – Tasmanian blue gum, southern blue gum, blue gum
  - Eucalyptus globulus subsp. maidenii (F.Muell.) J.B.Kirkp. – Maiden's gum
  - Eucalyptus globulus subsp. pseudoglobulus (Naudin ex Maiden) J.B.Kirkp. – Victorian eurabbie
- Eucalyptus glomericassis L.A.S.Johnson & K.D.Hill – scarp white gum
- Eucalyptus glomerosa Brooker & Hopper – jinjulu
- Eucalyptus gomphocephala A.Cunn. ex DC. – tuart
- Eucalyptus gongylocarpa Blakely – baarla, marble gum, desert gum
- Eucalyptus goniantha Turcz. – Jerdacuttup mallee
  - Eucalyptus goniantha subsp. goniantha
  - Eucalyptus goniantha subsp. kynoura D.Nicolle & M.E.French
- Eucalyptus goniocalyx F.Muell. ex Miq. – long-leaved box, olive-barked box, bundy
  - Eucalyptus goniocalyx subsp. exposa D.Nicolle
  - Eucalyptus goniocalyx subsp. fallax Rule
  - Eucalyptus goniocalyx subsp. goniocalyx
  - Eucalyptus goniocalyx subsp. laxa Rule
  - Eucalyptus goniocalyx subsp. viridissima Rule
- Eucalyptus goniocarpa L.A.S.Johnson & K.D.Hill
- Eucalyptus gracilis F.Muell. – yorrell, white mallee
- Eucalyptus grandis W.Hill – flooded gum, rose gum
- Eucalyptus granitica L.A.S.Johnson & K.D.Hill – granite ironbark
- Eucalyptus gregoryensis N.G.Walsh & Albr.
- Eucalyptus gregsoniana L.A.S.Johnson & Blaxell – Wolgan snow gum, mallee snow gum
- Eucalyptus griffithsii Maiden – Griffith's grey gum
- Eucalyptus grisea L.A.S.Johnson & K.D.Hill – grey gum
- Eucalyptus grossa F.Muell. ex Benth. – coarse-leaved mallee
- Eucalyptus guilfoylei Maiden – yellow tingle
- Eucalyptus gunnii Hook.f. – cider gum
  - Eucalyptus gunnii subsp. divaricata (McAulay & Brett) B.M.Potts
  - Eucalyptus gunnii subsp. gunnii
- Eucalyptus gypsophila Nicolle – kopi mallee

== H ==
- Eucalyptus haemastoma Sm. – scribbly gum
- Eucalyptus hallii Brooker – Goodwood gum
- Eucalyptus halophila D.J.Carr & S.G.M.Carr – salt lake mallee
- Eucalyptus hawkeri Rule
- Eucalyptus hebetifolia Brooker & Hopper
- Eucalyptus helidonica K.D.Hill
- Eucalyptus herbertiana Maiden – Kalumburu gum, yellow-barked mallee
- Eucalyptus histophylla Brooker & Hopper
- Eucalyptus horistes L.A.S.Johnson & K.D.Hill
- Eucalyptus houseana W.Fitzg. ex Maiden – Kimberley white gum, tropical white gum
- Eucalyptus howittiana F.Muell. – Howitt's box
- Eucalyptus hypolaena L.A.S.Johnson & K.D.Hill
- Eucalyptus hypostomatica L.A.S.Johnson & K.D.Hill – Pokolbin box

== I ==
- Eucalyptus ignorabilis L.A.S.Johnson & K.D.Hill
- Eucalyptus imitans L.A.S.Johnson & K.D.Hill – Illawarra stringybark
- Eucalyptus imlayensis Crisp & Brooker – Mount Imlay mallee
- Eucalyptus impensa Brooker & Hopper – Eneabba mallee
- Eucalyptus incerata Brooker & Hopper – Mount Dau mallee
- Eucalyptus incrassata Labill. – lerp mallee, yellow mallee, ridge fruited mallee, rib fruited mallee
- Eucalyptus indurata Brooker & Hopper – ironbark or ironbark mallee
- Eucalyptus infera A.R.Bean – Durikai mallee
- Eucalyptus infracorticata L.A.S.Johnson & K.D.Hill
- Eucalyptus insularis Brooker – Twin Peak Island mallee, North Twin Peak Island mallee
  - Eucalyptus insularis subsp. continentalis D.Nicolle & Brooker
  - Eucalyptus insularis subsp. insularis
- Eucalyptus interstans L.A.S.Johnson & K.D.Hill
- Eucalyptus intertexta R.T.Baker western red box, gum coolibah, bastard coolibah

== J ==
- Eucalyptus jacksonii Maiden – red tingle
- Eucalyptus jensenii Maiden – Wandi ironbark
- Eucalyptus jimberlanica L.A.S.Johnson & K.D.Hill – Norseman gimlet
- Eucalyptus johnsoniana Brooker & Blaxell – Johnson's mallee
- Eucalyptus johnstonii Maiden – Tasmanian yellow gum
- Eucalyptus jucunda C.A.Gardner – Yuna mallee
- Eucalyptus jutsonii Maiden – Jutson's mallee
  - Eucalyptus jutsonii subsp. jutsonii
  - Eucalyptus jutsonii subsp. kobela D.Nicolle & M.E.French

== K ==
- Eucalyptus kabiana L.A.S.Johnson & K.D.Hill – Mt Beerwah mallee
- Eucalyptus × kalangadooensis Maiden & Blakely
- Eucalyptus kartzoffiana L.A.S.Johnson & Blaxell – Araluen gum
- Eucalyptus kenneallyi K.D.Hill & L.A.S.Johnson – Kenneally's white gum
- Eucalyptus kessellii Maiden & Blakely – Jerdacuttup mallee
  - Eucalyptus kessellii subsp. eugnosta L.A.S.Johnson & K.D.Hill
  - Eucalyptus kessellii subsp. kessellii
- Eucalyptus kingsmillii (Maiden) Maiden & Blakely in J.H.Maiden
  - Eucalyptus kingsmillii subsp. kingsmillii
- Eucalyptus kitsoniana Maiden – Gippsland mallee, bog gum
- Eucalyptus kochii Maiden & Blakely in J.H.Maiden – oil mallee
  - Eucalyptus kochii subsp. amaryssia D.Nicolle
  - Eucalyptus kochii subsp. borealis (C.A.Gardner) D.Nicolle
  - Eucalyptus kochii subsp. kochii
  - Eucalyptus kochii subsp. plenissima (C.A.Gardner) Brooker
  - Eucalyptus kochii subsp. yellowdinensis D.Nicolle
- Eucalyptus kondininensis Maiden & Blakely – Kondinin blackbutt
- Eucalyptus koolpinensis Brooker & Dunlop – Koolpin box
- Eucalyptus kruseana F.Muell. – book-leaf mallee, Kruses's bookleaf mallee
- Eucalyptus kumarlensis Brooker
- Eucalyptus kybeanensis Maiden & Cambage – Kybean mallee ash

== L ==
- Eucalyptus lacrimans L.A.S.Johnson & K.D.Hill – weeping snow gum
- Eucalyptus laeliae Podger & Chippend. – Darling Range ghost gum, butter gum
- Eucalyptus laevis L.A.S.Johnson & K.D.Hill
- Eucalyptus laevopinea F.Muell. ex R.T.Baker – silver top stringybark
- Eucalyptus × lamprocalyx Blakely
- Eucalyptus lane-poolei Maiden – salmon white gum
- Eucalyptus langleyi L.A.S.Johnson & Blaxell – green mallee ash, albatross mallee
- Eucalyptus lansdowneana F.Muell. & J.E.Br. in J.E.Brown – crimson mallee, red-flowered mallee box
- Eucalyptus largeana Blakely & Beuzev. in W.F.Blakely – Craven grey box
- Eucalyptus largiflorens F.Muell. – black box
- Eucalyptus × laseronii R.T.Baker
- Eucalyptus latens Brooker – narrow-leaved red mallee
- Eucalyptus lateritica Brooker & Hopper – laterite mallee
- Eucalyptus latisinensis K.D.Hill – white mahogany
- Eucalyptus lehmannii (Schauer) Benth. – bushy yate
  - Eucalyptus lehmannii subsp. lehmannii
  - Eucalyptus lehmannii subsp. parallela D.Nicolle & M.E.French
- Eucalyptus leprophloia Brooker & Hopper – scaly butt mallee
- Eucalyptus leptocalyx Blakely – Hopetoun mallee
  - Eucalyptus leptocalyx subsp. leptocalyx
  - Eucalyptus leptocalyx subsp. petilipes L.A.S.Johnson & K.D.Hill
- Eucalyptus leptophleba F.Muell. – Molloy red box, Molloy box
- Eucalyptus leptophylla F.Muell. ex Miq. – March mallee, slender-leaved red mallee, narrow-leaved red mallee
- Eucalyptus leptopoda Benth. – Tammin mallee,
  - Eucalyptus leptopoda subsp. arctata L.A.S.Johnson & K.D.Hill
  - Eucalyptus leptopoda subsp. elevata L.A.S.Johnson & K.D.Hill
  - Eucalyptus leptopoda subsp. leptopoda
  - Eucalyptus leptopoda subsp. subluta L.A.S.Johnson & K.D.Hill
- Eucalyptus lesouefii Maiden – goldfields blackbutt
- Eucalyptus leucophloia Brooker – snappy gum, migum
  - Eucalyptus leucophloia subsp. euroa L.A.S.Johnson & K.D.Hill
  - Eucalyptus leucophloia subsp. leucophloia
- Eucalyptus leucophylla Domin – Cloncurry box
- Eucalyptus leucoxylon F.Muell. – yellow gum, blue gum, white ironbark
  - Eucalyptus leucoxylon subsp. bellarinensis Rule
  - Eucalyptus leucoxylon subsp. connata Rule
  - Eucalyptus leucoxylon subsp. leucoxylon
  - Eucalyptus leucoxylon subsp. megalocarpa Boland
  - Eucalyptus leucoxylon var. pluriflora Boland
  - Eucalyptus leucoxylon subsp. pruinosa (Miq.) Boland
  - Eucalyptus leucoxylon subsp. stephaniae Rule
- Eucalyptus ligulata Brooker – Lucky Bay mallee
  - Eucalyptus ligulata subsp. ligulata
  - Eucalyptus ligulata subsp. stirlingica D.Nicolle,
- Eucalyptus ligustrina A.Cunn. ex DC. – privet-leaved stringybark
- Eucalyptus limitaris L.A.S.Johnson & K.D.Hill
- Eucalyptus lirata W.Fitzg. ex Maiden – Kimberley yellowjacket
- Eucalyptus litoralis Rule – Anglesea box
- Eucalyptus litorea Brooker & Hopper – saline mallee
- Eucalyptus livida Brooker & Hopper – wandoo mallee
- Eucalyptus lockyeri Blaxell & K.D.Hill – Lockyer's box
  - Eucalyptus lockyeri subsp. exuta Brooker & Kleinig
  - Eucalyptus lockyeri subsp. lockyeri
- Eucalyptus longicornis (F.Muell.) Maiden – red morrel, morryl, poot, pu
- Eucalyptus longifolia Link – woollybutt
- Eucalyptus longirostrata (Blakely) L.A.S.Johnson & K.D.Hill – grey gum
- Eucalyptus longissima D.Nicolle
- Eucalyptus loxophleba Benth.
  - Eucalyptus loxophleba subsp. gratiae Brooker – York gum, daarwet, goatta, twotta, yandee
  - Eucalyptus loxophleba subsp. lissophloia L.A.S.Johnson & K.D.Hill
  - Eucalyptus loxophleba subsp. loxophleba
  - Eucalyptus loxophleba subsp. supralaevis L.A.S.Johnson & K.D.Hill
- Eucalyptus lucasii Blakely – Barlee box
- Eucalyptus lucens Brooker & Dunlop – shiny-leaved mallee
- Eucalyptus luculenta L.A.S.Johnson & K.D.Hill
- Eucalyptus luehmanniana F.Muell. – yellow top mallee ash
- Eucalyptus luteola Brooker & Hopper

== M ==
- Eucalyptus macarthurii H.Deane & Maiden – Camden woollybutt, Paddy's river box
- Eucalyptus mackintii Kottek – blue-crowned stringybark
- Eucalyptus × macmahonii Rule
- Eucalyptus macrandra F.Muell. ex Benth. – long-flowered marlock, river yate, twet
- Eucalyptus macrocarpa Hook. – mottlecah
  - Eucalyptus macrocarpa subsp. elachantha Brooker & Hopper
  - Eucalyptus macrocarpa subsp. macrocarpa
- Eucalyptus macrorhyncha F.Muell. ex Benth. – red stringybark
  - Eucalyptus macrorhyncha subsp. cannonii (R.T.Baker) L.A.S.Johnson & Blaxell
  - Eucalyptus macrorhyncha subsp. macrorhyncha
- Eucalyptus magnificata L.A.S.Johnson & K.D.Hill – blue box, northern blue box
- Eucalyptus major (Maiden) Blakely – grey gum
- Eucalyptus malacoxylon Blakely – Moonbi apple box, apple box
- Eucalyptus mannensis Boomsma – Mann Range mallee
  - Eucalyptus mannensis subsp. mannensis
  - Eucalyptus mannensis subsp. vespertina L.A.S.Johnson & K.D.Hill
- Eucalyptus mannifera Mudie – brittle gum, red spotted gum
  - Eucalyptus mannifera subsp. gullickii (R.T.Baker & H.G.Sm.) L.A.S.Johnson
  - Eucalyptus mannifera subsp. mannifera
  - Eucalyptus mannifera subsp. praecox (Maiden) L.A.S.Johnson
- Eucalyptus marginata Donn ex Sm. – jarrah, djarraly, Swan River mahogany
  - Eucalyptus marginata subsp. marginata
  - Eucalyptus marginata subsp. thalassica Brooker & Hopper
- Eucalyptus mckieana Blakely – McKie's stringybark
- Eucalyptus mcquoidii Brooker & Hopper – Quoin Head marlock
- Eucalyptus mediocris L.A.S.Johnson & K.D.Hill – inland white mahogany
- Eucalyptus megacarpa F.Muell. – bullich
- Eucalyptus megacornuta C.A.Gardner – warted yate, warty yate
- Eucalyptus megasepala A.R.Bean
- Eucalyptus melanoleuca S.T.Blake – yarraman ironbark, nanango ironbark
- Eucalyptus melanophitra Brooker & Hopper
- Eucalyptus melanophloia F.Muell. – silver-leaved ironbark
  - Eucalyptus melanophloia subsp. melanophloia
  - Eucalyptus melanophloia subsp. nana D.Nicolle & Kleinig
- Eucalyptus melanoxylon Maiden – black morrell
- Eucalyptus melliodora A.Cunn. ex Schauer in W.G.Walpers – yellow box, honey box, yellow ironbark
- Eucalyptus merrickiae Maiden & Blakely – goblet mallee
- Eucalyptus michaeliana Blakely – Hillgrove gum, brittle gum
- Eucalyptus micranthera F.Muell. ex Benth. – Alexander River mallee, milkshake mallee
- Eucalyptus microcarpa (Maiden) Maiden – grey box
- Eucalyptus microcorys F.Muell. – tallowwood
- Eucalyptus microneura Maiden & Blakely – Gilbert River box
- Eucalyptus microschema Brooker & Hopper
- Eucalyptus microtheca F.Muell. – coolibah
- Eucalyptus mimica Brooker & Hopper
  - Eucalyptus mimica subsp. continens Brooker & Hopper
  - Eucalyptus mimica subsp. mimica
- Eucalyptus miniata A.Cunn. ex Schauer in W.G.Walpers – Darwin woollybutt, woolewoorng
- Eucalyptus minniritchi D.Nicolle
- Eucalyptus misella L.A.S.Johnson & K.D.Hill
- Eucalyptus × missilis Brooker & Hopper
- Eucalyptus mitchelliana Cambage – Buffalo sallee, Mount Buffalo gum
- Eucalyptus moderata L.A.S.Johnson & K.D.Hill
- Eucalyptus moluccana Wall. ex Roxb. – grey box, gum-topped box, terriyergro
- Eucalyptus molyneuxii Rule
- Eucalyptus mooreana Maiden – Moore's gum, mountain white gum, King Leopold Range mallee
- Eucalyptus moorei Maiden & Cambage – narrow-leaved mallee
  - Eucalyptus moorei subsp. moorei
  - Eucalyptus moorei subsp.. serpentinicola (L.A.S.Johnson & Blaxell) Brooker & Kleinig
- Eucalyptus morrisbyi Brett – Morrisby's gum
- Eucalyptus morrisii R.T.Baker – grey mallee
- Eucalyptus muelleriana A.W.Howitt – yellow stringybark
- Eucalyptus multicaulis Blakely – whipstick mallee ash
- Eucalyptus myriadena Brooker – blackbutt
  - Eucalyptus myriadena subsp. myriadena
  - Eucalyptus myriadena subsp. parviflora Brooker & Hopper

== N ==
- Eucalyptus nandewarica L.A.S.Johnson & K.D.Hill – mallee red gum
- Eucalyptus nebulosa A.M.Gray – serpentine peppermint
- Eucalyptus neglecta Maiden – Omeo gum
- Eucalyptus × nepeanensis R.T.Baker & H.G.Sm.
- Eucalyptus neutra D.Nicolle – Newdegate mallee
- Eucalyptus newbeyi D.J.Carr & S.G.M.Carr – Beaufort Inlet mallee
- Eucalyptus nicholii Maiden & Blakely in J.H.Maiden – narrow-leaved black peppermint, willow peppermint
- Eucalyptus nigrifunda Brooker & Hopper – desert wandoo
- Eucalyptus nitens (H.Deane & Maiden) Maiden – shining gum, silvertop
- Eucalyptus nitida Hook.f. – Smithton peppermint
- Eucalyptus nobilis L.A.S.Johnson & K.D.Hill – ribbon gum, giant white gum
- Eucalyptus normantonensis Maiden & Cambage – Normanton box
- Eucalyptus nortonii (Blakely) L.A.S.Johnson – bundy, mealy bundy, long-leaved box
- Eucalyptus notabilis Maiden – Blue Mountains mahogany, mountain mahogany
- Eucalyptus notactites (L.A.S.Johnson & K.D.Hill) D.Nicolle & M.E.French – southern limestone mallee
- Eucalyptus nova-anglica H.Deane & Maiden New England peppermint, black peppermint
- Eucalyptus × nowraensis Maiden
- Eucalyptus nudicaulis A.R.Bean
- Eucalyptus nutans F.Muell. – red-flowered moort

== O ==
- Eucalyptus obconica Brooker & Kleinig
- Eucalyptus obesa Brooker & Hopper – Ninety Mile Tank mallee
- Eucalyptus obliqua L'Hér. – messmate stringybark, messmate
- Eucalyptus obtusiflora A.Cunn. ex DC.) – Dongara mallee
  - Eucalyptus obtusiflora subsp. cowcowensis L.A.S.Johnson & K.D.Hill
  - Eucalyptus obtusiflora subsp. dongarraensis (Maiden & Blakely) L.A.S.Johnson & K.D.Hill
  - Eucalyptus obtusiflora subsp. obtusiflora
- Eucalyptus occidentalis Endl. – flat-topped yate, swamp yate, mo, yundill
- Eucalyptus ochrophloia F.Muell. – yapunyah
- Eucalyptus odontocarpa F.Muell. – Sturt Creek mallee, warilyu
- Eucalyptus odorata Behr – peppermint box
- Eucalyptus oldfieldii F.Muell. – Oldfield's mallee
  - Eucalyptus oldfieldii F.Muell. subsp. oldfieldii
- Eucalyptus oleosa F.Muell. ex Miq. – red mallee, glossy-leaved red mallee, acorn mallee, oil mallee, giant mallee
  - Eucalyptus oleosa subsp. ampliata L.A.S.Johnson & K.D.Hill
  - Eucalyptus oleosa subsp. corvina L.A.S.Johnson & K.D.Hill
  - Eucalyptus oleosa subsp. cylindroidea L.A.S.Johnson & K.D.Hill
  - Eucalyptus oleosa subsp. oleosa
- Eucalyptus olida L.A.S.Johnson & K.D.Hill
- Eucalyptus oligantha Schauer in W.G.Walpers – broad-leaved box
  - Eucalyptus oligantha subsp. modica L.A.S.Johnson & K.D.Hill
  - Eucalyptus oligantha subsp. oligantha
- Eucalyptus olivina Brooker & Hopper
- Eucalyptus olsenii L.A.S.Johnson & Blaxell – woila gum
- Eucalyptus ophitica L.A.S.Johnson & K.D.Hill – serpentine ironbark
- Eucalyptus opimiflora D.Nicolle & M.E.French – northern silver mallee
- Eucalyptus optima L.A.S.Johnson & K.D.Hill
- Eucalyptus oraria L.A.S.Johnson – ooragmandee
- Eucalyptus orbifolia F.Muell. – round-leaved mallee
- Eucalyptus ordiana Dunlop & Done
- Eucalyptus oreades F.Muell. ex R.T.Baker – Blue Mountains ash, white ash, smooth-barked mountain ash
- Eucalyptus orgadophila Maiden & Blakely in J.H.Maiden – mountain coolibah
- Eucalyptus ornans Molyneux & Rule – Avon peppermint
- Eucalyptus ornata Crisp – silver mallet
- Eucalyptus orophila L.D.Pryor
- Eucalyptus orthostemon D.Nicolle & Brooker
- Eucalyptus ovata Labill. – swamp gum or black gum
  - Eucalyptus ovata var. grandiflora Maiden
  - Eucalyptus ovata Labill. var. ovata
- Eucalyptus ovularis Maiden & Blakely – small-fruited mallee
- Eucalyptus oxymitra Blakely – sharp-capped mallee

== P ==
- Eucalyptus pachycalyx Maiden & Blakely in J.H.Maiden – shiny-barked gum
  - Eucalyptus pachycalyx subsp. banyabba K.D.Hill
  - Eucalyptus pachycalyx subsp. pachycalyx
  - Eucalyptus pachycalyx subsp. waajensis L.A.S.Johnson & K.D.Hill
- Eucalyptus pachyloma Benth. – Kalgan Plains mallee
- Eucalyptus pachyphylla F.Muell. – thick-leaved mallee, red-budded mallee
- Eucalyptus paedoglauca L.A.S.Johnson & Blaxell – Mount Stuart ironbark
- Eucalyptus paliformis L.A.S.Johnson & Blaxell – Wadbilliga ash
- Eucalyptus paludicola Nicolle – Mount Compass swamp gum, marsh gum, Fleurieu swamp gum
- Eucalyptus panda S.T.Blake – tumbledown ironbark, Yetman ironbark
- Eucalyptus paniculata Sm. – grey ironbark
- Eucalyptus pantoleuca L.A.S.Johnson & K.D.Hill – round-leaved gum, Panton River white gum
- Eucalyptus paralimnetica L.A.S.Johnson & K.D.Hill
- Eucalyptus parramattensis E.C.Hall – Parramatta red gum, drooping red gum
  - Eucalyptus parramattensis subsp. decadens L.A.S.Johnson & Blaxell
  - Eucalyptus parramattensis subsp. parramattensis
  - Eucalyptus parramattensis var. sphaerocalyx Blakely
- Eucalyptus parvula L.A.S.Johnson & K.D.Hill – small-leaved gum
- Eucalyptus patellaris F.Muell. – weeping box
- Eucalyptus patens Benth. – yarri, blackbutt,
- Eucalyptus pauciflora Sieber ex Spreng. – snow gum, cabbage gum, white sally
  - Eucalyptus pauciflora subsp. acerina Rule – snow gum
  - Eucalyptus pauciflora var. × cylindrocarpa Blakely
  - Eucalyptus pauciflora subsp. debeuzevillei (Maiden) L.A.S.Johnson & Blaxell – Jounama snow gum
  - Eucalyptus pauciflora var. × densiflora Blakely & McKie
  - Eucalyptus pauciflora subsp. hedraia Rule
  - Eucalyptus pauciflora subsp. niphophila (Maiden & Blakely) L.A.S.Johnson & Blaxell
  - Eucalyptus pauciflora subsp. parvifructa Rule
  - Eucalyptus pauciflora Sieber ex Spreng. subsp. pauciflora
  - Eucalyptus pauciflora var. × rusticata Blakely
- Eucalyptus pellita F.Muell. – large-fruited red mahogany
- Eucalyptus pendens Brooker – Badgingarra weeping mallee
- Eucalyptus peninsularis D.Nicolle – Cummins mallee
- Eucalyptus perangusta Brooker – fine-leaved mallee
- Eucalyptus percostata Brooker & P.J.Lang – rib-capped mallee, Devils peak mallee
- Eucalyptus perriniana F.Muell. ex Rodway – spinning gum
- Eucalyptus persistens L.A.S.Johnson & K.D.Hill
- Eucalyptus petiolaris (Boland) Rule – Eyre Peninsula blue gum, water gum, blue gum
- Eucalyptus petraea D.J.Carr & S.G.M.Carr – granite rock box
- Eucalyptus petrensis Brooker & Hopper – limestone mallee, straggly mallee, koodjat
- Eucalyptus phaenophylla Brooker & Hopper – common southern mallee
  - Eucalyptus phaenophylla subsp. interjacens Brooker & Hopper
  - Eucalyptus phaenophylla Brooker & Hopper subsp. phaenophylla
- Eucalyptus phenax Brooker & Slee – green dumosa mallee, white mallee
  - Eucalyptus phenax subsp. compressa D.Nicolle
  - Eucalyptus phenax Brooker & Slee subsp. phenax
- Eucalyptus phoenicea F.Muell. – scarlet gum, gnaingar, ngainggar
- Eucalyptus phoenix Molyneux & Forrester – brumby mallee-gum
- Eucalyptus × phylacis L.A.S.Johnson & K.D.Hill – Meelup mallee
- Eucalyptus pilbarensis Brooker & Edgecombe
- Eucalyptus pileata Blakely – capped mallee
- Eucalyptus pilularis Sm. – blackbutt
- Eucalyptus pimpiniana Maiden – pimpin mallee
- Eucalyptus piperita Sm. – Sydney peppermint, urn-fruited peppermint
- Eucalyptus placita L.A.S.Johnson & K.D.Hill – grey ironbark
- Eucalyptus planchoniana F.Muell. – needlebark stringybark, bastard tallowwood
- Eucalyptus planipes L.A.S.Johnson & K.D.Hill
- Eucalyptus platycorys Maiden & Blakely in J.H.Maiden – Boorabbin mallee
- Eucalyptus platydisca D.Nicolle & Brooker – Jimberlana mallee
- Eucalyptus platyphylla F.Muell. – poplar gum or white gum
- Eucalyptus platypus Hook.f. – moort, maalok
  - Eucalyptus platypus subsp. congregata Brooker & Hopper
  - Eucalyptus platypus Hook.f. subsp. platypus
- Eucalyptus pleurocarpa Schauer in J.G.C.Lehmann – tallerack, talyerock, tallerack
- Eucalyptus pleurocorys L.A.S.Johnson & K.D.Hill
- Eucalyptus pluricaulis Brooker & Hopper – purple-leaved mallee
  - Eucalyptus pluricaulis Brooker & Hopper subsp. pluricaulis
  - Eucalyptus pluricaulis subsp. porphyrea Brooker & Hopper
- Eucalyptus polita Brooker & Hopper
- Eucalyptus polyanthemos Schauer – red box
  - Eucalyptus polyanthemos subsp. longior Brooker & Slee
  - Eucalyptus polyanthemos subsp. marginalis Rule
  - Eucalyptus polyanthemos Schauer subsp. polyanthemos
  - Eucalyptus polyanthemos subsp. vestita L.A.S.Johnson & K.D.Hill
- Eucalyptus polybractea F.Muell. ex R.T.Baker – blue-leaved mallee, blue mallee
- Eucalyptus populnea F.Muell. – poplar box, bimble box, bimbil box
- Eucalyptus porosa F.Muell. ex Miq. – mallee box, Quorn mallee, water mallee
- Eucalyptus praetermissa Brooker & Hopper
- Eucalyptus prava L.A.S.Johnson & K.D.Hill – orange gum
- Eucalyptus preissiana Schauer – bell-fruited mallee
  - Eucalyptus preissiana subsp. lobata Brooker & Slee
  - Eucalyptus preissiana Schauer subsp. preissiana
- Eucalyptus prolixa D.Nicolle – square-fruited mallet
- Eucalyptus prominens Brooker
- Eucalyptus propinqua H.Deane & Maiden – grey gum, small-fruited grey gum
- Eucalyptus protensa L.A.S.Johnson & K.D.Hill
- Eucalyptus provecta A.R.Bean
- Eucalyptus proxima D.Nicolle & Brooker – nodding mallee, red-flowered mallee
- Eucalyptus pruiniramis L.A.S.Johnson & K.D.Hill – Jingymia gum, midlands gum
- Eucalyptus pruinosa Schauer in W.G.Walpers – silver box, silver leaf box, apple box, smoke tree
  - Eucalyptus pruinosa subsp. pruinosa
  - Eucalyptus pruinosa subsp. tenuata L.A.S.Johnson & K.D.Hill
- Eucalyptus psammitica L.A.S.Johnson & K.D.Hill – bastard white mahogany
- Eucalyptus pterocarpa C.A.Gardner ex P.J.Lang
- Eucalyptus pulchella Desf. – white peppermint, narrow-leaved peppermint
- Eucalyptus pulverulenta Link – silver-leaved mountain gum
- Eucalyptus pumila Cambage – Pokolbin mallee
- Eucalyptus punctata A.Cunn. ex DC. – grey gum
- Eucalyptus purpurata D.Nicolle – Bandalup silver mallet
- Eucalyptus pyrenea Rule – Pyrenees gum
- Eucalyptus pyriformis Turcz. – pear-fruited mallee, Dowerin rose
- Eucalyptus pyrocarpa L.A.S.Johnson & Blaxell – large-fruited blackbutt

== Q ==
- Eucalyptus quadrangulata H.Deane & Maiden – white-topped box, coast white box
- Eucalyptus quadrans Brooker & Hopper
- Eucalyptus quadricostata Brooker – square-fruited ironbark
- Eucalyptus quaerenda (L.A.S.Johnson & K.D.Hill) Byrne
- Eucalyptus quinniorum J.T.Hunter & J.J.Bruhl – monkey gum

== R ==
- Eucalyptus racemosa Cav. – snappy gum, narrow-leaved scribbly gum
- Eucalyptus radiata Sieber ex DC. – narrow-leaved peppermint, Forth River peppermint,
  - Eucalyptus radiata Sieber ex DC. subsp. radiata
  - Eucalyptus radiata subsp. robertsonii (Blakely) L.A.S.Johnson & Blaxell
  - Eucalyptus radiata subsp. sejuncta L.A.S.Johnson & K.D.Hill
- Eucalyptus rameliana F.Muell. – Ramel's mallee
- Eucalyptus raveretiana F.Muell. – black ironbox
- Eucalyptus ravida L.A.S.Johnson & K.D.Hill
- Eucalyptus recta L.A.S.Johnson & K.D.Hill – silver mallet
- Eucalyptus recurva Crisp – Mongarlowe mallee
- Eucalyptus redimiculifera L.A.S.Johnson & K.D.Hill
- Eucalyptus redunca Schauer in J.G.C.Lehmann – black marlock
- Eucalyptus regnans F.Muell. – mountain ash, swamp gum, stringy gum
- Eucalyptus relicta Hopper & Ward.-Johnson
- Eucalyptus remota Blakely – Kangaroo Island ash, Kangaroo Island mallee ash, Mount Taylor mallee
- Eucalyptus repullulans Nicolle – chrysoprase mallee
- Eucalyptus resinifera J.White – red mahogany, red messmate
  - Eucalyptus resinifera subsp. hemilampra (F.Muell.) L.A.S.Johnson & K.D.Hill
  - Eucalyptus resinifera Sm. subsp. resinifera
- Eucalyptus retinens L.A.S.Johnson & K.D.Hill – Hillgrove box
- Eucalyptus retusa D.Nicolle, M.E.French & McQuoid – Point Hood yate
- Eucalyptus revelata D.Nicolle & R.L.Barrett
- Eucalyptus rhodantha Blakely & H.Steedman – rose mallee
  - Eucalyptus rhodantha var. petiolaris Blakely
  - Eucalyptus rhodantha Blakely & H.Steedman var. rhodantha
- Eucalyptus rhombica A.R.Bean & Brooker
- Eucalyptus rhomboidea Hopper & D.Nicolle – diamond gum
- Eucalyptus rigens Brooker & Hopper – saltlake mallee, blue salt mallee
- Eucalyptus rigidula Cambage & Blakely in J.H.Maiden – stiff-leaved mallee
- Eucalyptus risdonii Hook.f. – Risdon peppermint
- Eucalyptus robusta Sm. – swamp mahogany, swamp messmate
- Eucalyptus rodwayi R.T.Baker & H.G.Sm. – swamp peppermint
- Eucalyptus rosacea L.A.S.Johnson & K.D.Hill
- Eucalyptus rossii R.T.Baker & H.G.Sm. – inland scribbly gum, white gum
- Eucalyptus rowleyi D.Nicolle & M.E.French
- Eucalyptus roycei S.G.M.Carr, D.J.Carr & A.S.George – Shark Bay mallee
- Eucalyptus rubida H.Deane & Maiden – candlebark, ribbon gum, white gum
  - Eucalyptus rubida subsp. barbigerorum L.A.S.Johnson & K.D.Hill
  - Eucalyptus rubida H.Deane & Maiden subsp. rubida
- Eucalyptus rubiginosa Brooker
- Eucalyptus rudderi Maiden – Rudder's box
- Eucalyptus rudis Endl. – flooded gum, moitch, colaille, gooloorto, koolert
  - Eucalyptus rudis subsp. cratyantha Brooker & Hopper
  - Eucalyptus rudis Endl. subsp. rudis
- Eucalyptus rugosa R.Br. ex Blakely – Kingscote mallee
- Eucalyptus rugulata D.Nicolle
- Eucalyptus rummeryi Maiden – steel box, Rummery's box, brown box
- Eucalyptus rupestris Brooker & Done – Prince Regent gum

== S ==
- Eucalyptus sabulosa Rule – Wimmera scentbark
- Eucalyptus salicola Brooker – salt gum, salt lake salmon gum, salt salmon gum
- Eucalyptus saligna Sm. – Sydney blue gum or blue gum
- Eucalyptus salmonophloia F.Muell. salmon gum, wurak, weerluk
- Eucalyptus salubris F.Muell. – gimlet, fluted gum tree, gimlet gum, silver-topped gimlet
- Eucalyptus sargentii Maiden – Salt River gum
  - Eucalyptus sargentii subsp. onesia D.Nicolle
  - Eucalyptus sargentii subsp. sargentii
- Eucalyptus saxatilis J.B.Kirkp. & Brooker – Suggan Buggan mallee, Mount Wheeler mallee
- Eucalyptus scias L.A.S.Johnson & K.D.Hill – large-fruited red mahogany
  - Eucalyptus scias subsp. apoda L.A.S.Johnson & K.D.Hill
  - Eucalyptus scias subsp. scias
- Eucalyptus scoparia Maiden – Wallangarra white gum, willow gum
- Eucalyptus scopulorum K.D.Hill
- Eucalyptus scyphocalyx (Benth.) Maiden & Blakely in J.H.Maiden – goblet mallee
  - Eucalyptus scyphocalyx subsp. scyphocalyx
  - Eucalyptus scyphocalyx subsp. triadica L.A.S.Johnson & K.D.Hill
- Eucalyptus seeana Maiden – narrow-leaved red gum
- Eucalyptus semiglobosa (Brooker) L.A.S.Johnson & K.D.Hill
- Eucalyptus semota Macph. & Grayling – marymia mallee
- Eucalyptus sepulcralis F.Muell. – weeping gum, weeping mallee
- Eucalyptus serraensis Ladiges & Whiffin – Grampians stringybark
- Eucalyptus sessilis (Maiden) Blakely – Finke River mallee, red bud mallee, river mallee
- Eucalyptus sheathiana Maiden – ribbon-barked gum
- Eucalyptus shirleyi Maiden – Shirley's silver leafed ironbark, silver-leaved ironbark, Shirley's silver leaved ironbark
- Eucalyptus sicilifolia L.A.S.Johnson & K.D.Hill
- Eucalyptus siderophloia Benth. – northern grey ironbark
- Eucalyptus sideroxylon A.Cunn. ex Woolls – mugga ironbark, red ironbark
  - Eucalyptus sideroxylon subsp. improcera A.R.Bean
  - Eucalyptus sideroxylon subsp. sideroxylon
- Eucalyptus sieberi L.A.S.Johnson – silvertop ash, black ash
- Eucalyptus silvestris Rule
- Eucalyptus similis Maiden – inland yellowjacket, Queensland yellowjacket
- Eucalyptus singularis L.A.S.Johnson & Blaxell
- Eucalyptus sinuosa D.Nicolle, M.E.French & McQuoid – octopus mallee
- Eucalyptus smithii F.Muell. ex R.T.Baker – gully gum, gully peppermint, blackbutt peppermint, ironbark peppermint
- Eucalyptus socialis F.Muell. ex Miq. – red mallee, grey mallee
  - Eucalyptus socialis subsp. eucentrica (L.A.S.Johnson & K.D.Hill) D.Nicolle – inland red mallee
  - Eucalyptus socialis F.Muell. ex Miq. subsp. socialis – summer red mallee
  - Eucalyptus socialis subsp. victoriensis D.Nicolle – red mallee
  - Eucalyptus socialis subsp. viridans D.Nicolle – green-leaved red mallee
- Eucalyptus sparsa Boomsma – northern ranges box
- Eucalyptus sparsifolia Blakely – narrow-leaved stringybark
- Eucalyptus spathulata Hook. – swamp mallet, narrow leaved gimlet, swamp gimlet
  - Eucalyptus spathulata subsp. salina D.Nicolle & Brooker
  - Eucalyptus spathulata subsp. spathulata
- Eucalyptus sphaerocarpa L.A.S.Johnson & Blaxell – Blackdown stringybark
- Eucalyptus splendens Rule – apple jack
- Eucalyptus sporadica Brooker & Hopper – Burngup mallee
- Eucalyptus spreta L.A.S.Johnson & K.D.Hill
- Eucalyptus squamosa H.Deane & Maiden – scaly bark
- Eucalyptus staeri (Maiden) Maiden ex Kessell & C.A.Gardner – Albany blackbutt
- Eucalyptus staigeriana F.Muell. ex F.M.Bailey – lemon-scented ironbark
- Eucalyptus steedmanii C.A.Gardner – Steedman's gum, Steedman's mallet
- Eucalyptus stellulata Sieber ex DC. – black sallee, black sally
- Eucalyptus stenostoma L.A.S.Johnson & Blaxell – Jillaga ash
- Eucalyptus × stoataptera E.M.Benn.
- Eucalyptus stoatei C.A.Gardner – scarlet pear gum, Stoat's mallee
- Eucalyptus stowardii Maiden – fluted-horn mallee
- Eucalyptus striaticalyx W.Fitzg. – Cue York gum, kopi gum
  - Eucalyptus striaticalyx subsp. delicata D.Nicolle & P.J.Lang
  - Eucalyptus striaticalyx W.Fitzg. subsp. striaticalyx
- Eucalyptus stricklandii Maiden – Strickland's gum
- Eucalyptus stricta Sieber ex Spreng. – Blue Mountains mallee ash
- Eucalyptus strzeleckii Rule – Strzelecki gum, wax-tip
- Eucalyptus sturgissiana L.A.S.Johnson & Blaxell steel box, Ettrema mallee
- Eucalyptus subangusta (Blakely) Brooker & Hopper
  - Eucalyptus subangusta subsp. cerina Brooker & Hopper
  - Eucalyptus subangusta subsp. pusilla Brooker & Hopper
  - Eucalyptus subangusta subsp. subangusta
  - Eucalyptus subangusta subsp. virescens Brooker & Hopper
- Eucalyptus subcrenulata Maiden & Blakely in J.H.Maiden Tasmanian alpine yellow gum
- Eucalyptus suberea Brooker & Hopper – Mount Lesueur mallee, cork mallee
- Eucalyptus subtilis Brooker & Hopper – narrow-leaved mallee
- Eucalyptus suffulgens L.A.S.Johnson & K.D.Hill
- Eucalyptus suggrandis L.A.S.Johnson & K.D.Hill
  - Eucalyptus suggrandis subsp. promiscua D.Nicolle & Brooker
  - Eucalyptus suggrandis subsp. suggrandis
- Eucalyptus surgens Brooker & Hopper
- Eucalyptus sweedmaniana Hopper & McQuoid
- Eucalyptus synandra Crisp – Jingymia mallee

== T ==
- Eucalyptus talyuberlup D.J.Carr & S.G.M.Carr – Stirling Range yate
- Eucalyptus tardecidens (L.A.S.Johnson & K.D.Hill) A.R.Bean
- Eucalyptus taurina A.R.Bean & Brooker – Helidon ironbark
- Eucalyptus tectifica F.Muell. – Darwin box, grey box
- Eucalyptus tenella L.A.S.Johnson & K.D.Hill – narrow-leaved stringybark
- Eucalyptus tenera L.A.S.Johnson & K.D.Hill – glazed mallee, sand mallee
- Eucalyptus tenuipes (Maiden & Blakely) Blakely & C.T.White – narrow-leaved white mahogany
- Eucalyptus tenuiramis Miq. – silver peppermint
- Eucalyptus tenuis Brooker & Hopper
- Eucalyptus tephroclada L.A.S.Johnson & K.D.Hill
- Eucalyptus tephrodes L.A.S.Johnson & K.D.Hill
- Eucalyptus terebra L.A.S.Johnson & K.D.Hill – Balladonia gimlet
- Eucalyptus tereticornis Sm. – forest red gum, blue gum, red irongum
  - Eucalyptus tereticornis subsp. basaltica A.R.Bean
  - Eucalyptus tereticornis subsp. mediana Brooker & Slee
  - Eucalyptus tereticornis subsp. rotunda A.R.Bean
  - Eucalyptus tereticornis Sm. subsp. tereticornis
- Eucalyptus terrica A.R.Bean
- Eucalyptus tetrapleura L.A.S.Johnson – square-fruited ironbark
- Eucalyptus tetraptera Turcz. – square-fruited mallee, four-winged mallee
- Eucalyptus tetrodonta F.Muell. – Darwin stringybark, messmate
- Eucalyptus thamnoides Brooker & Hopper
  - Eucalyptus thamnoides subsp. megista Brooker & Hopper
  - Eucalyptus thamnoides subsp. thamnoides
- Eucalyptus tholiformis A.R.Bean & Brooker
- Eucalyptus thozetiana F.Muell. ex R.T.Baker
- Eucalyptus tindaliae Blakely in J.H.Maiden – Tindal's stringybark
- Eucalyptus tintinnans (Blakely & Jacobs) L.A.S.Johnson & K.D.Hill – ringing gum, Hills salmon gum
- Eucalyptus todtiana F.Muell. – coastal blackbutt, pricklybark, dwutta
- Eucalyptus × tokwa D.J.Carr & S.G.M.Carr
- Eucalyptus torquata Luehm. – coral gum, Coolgardie gum
- Eucalyptus tortilis L.A.S.Johnson & K.D.Hill
- Eucalyptus transcontinentalis Maiden – redwood, boongul
- Eucalyptus tricarpa (L.A.S.Johnson) L.A.S.Johnson & K.D.Hill – red ironbark, mugga ironbark
  - Eucalyptus tricarpa subsp. decora Rule
  - Eucalyptus tricarpa (L.A.S.Johnson) L.A.S.Johnson & K.D.Hill subsp. tricarpa
- Eucalyptus triflora (Maiden) Blakely – Pigeon House ash, three-flowered ash
- Eucalyptus trivalva Blakely – Victoria Spring mallee, desert mallee
- Eucalyptus tumida Brooker & Hopper

== U ==
- Eucalyptus ultima L.A.S.Johnson & K.D.Hill
- Eucalyptus umbra F.Muell. ex R.T.Baker – broad-leaved white mahogany
- Eucalyptus umbrawarrensis Maiden – Umbrawarra gum
- Eucalyptus uncinata Turcz. – hook-leaved mallee
- Eucalyptus urna D.Nicolle – merrit
- Eucalyptus urnigera Hook.f. – urn tree
- Eucalyptus × urnularis D.J.Carr & S.G.M.Carr
- Eucalyptus urophylla S.T.Blake (Indonesia, Timor) – Timor white gum, Timor mountain gum, popo, ampupu
- Eucalyptus utilis Brooker & Hopper – coastal moort, coastal mort

== V ==
- Eucalyptus valens L.A.S.Johnson & K.D.Hill
- Eucalyptus varia Brooker & Hopper
  - Eucalyptus varia subsp. salsuginosa Brooker & Hopper
  - Eucalyptus varia Brooker & Hopper subsp. varia
- Eucalyptus vegrandis L.A.S.Johnson & K.D.Hill – Ongerup mallee
  - Eucalyptus vegrandis subsp. recondita D.Nicolle & Brooker
  - Eucalyptus vegrandis L.A.S.Johnson & K.D.Hill subsp. vegrandis
- Eucalyptus vernicosa Hook.f. – varnished gum
- Eucalyptus verrucata Ladiges & Whiffin – Mount Abrupt stringybark
- Eucalyptus vesiculosa Brooker & Hopper – Corackerup marlock
- Eucalyptus vicina L.A.S.Johnson & K.D.Hill – Manara Hills red gum
- Eucalyptus victoriana Ladiges & Whiffin
- Eucalyptus victrix L.A.S.Johnson & K.D.Hill – smooth-barked coolibah, western coolibah, little ghost gum
- Eucalyptus viminalis Labill. – manna gum, white gum, ribbon gum
  - Eucalyptus viminalis subsp. cygnetensis Boomsma
  - Eucalyptus viminalis subsp. hentyensis Brooker & Slee
  - Eucalyptus viminalis subsp. pryoriana (L.A.S.Johnson) Brooker & Slee
  - Eucalyptus viminalis subsp. siliceana Rule
  - Eucalyptus viminalis Labill. subsp. viminalis
- Eucalyptus virens Brooker & A.R.Bean – shiny-leaved ironbark
- Eucalyptus virginea Hopper & Ward.-Johnson
- Eucalyptus viridis R.T.Baker – green mallee
- Eucalyptus vittata D.Nicolle
- Eucalyptus vokesensis D.Nicolle & L.A.S.Johnson & K.D.Hill – Vokes Hill mallee
- Eucalyptus volcanica L.A.S.Johnson & K.D.Hill

== W ==
- Eucalyptus walshii Rule
- Eucalyptus wandoo Blakely – wandoo, dooto, warrnt, wornt
  - Eucalyptus wandoo subsp. pulverea Brooker & Hopper
  - Eucalyptus wandoo Blakely subsp. wandoo
- Eucalyptus websteriana Maiden – Webster's mallee, heart-leaf mallee, dainty mallee
  - Eucalyptus websteriana subsp. norsemanica L.A.S.Johnson & K.D.Hill
  - Eucalyptus websteriana Maiden subsp. websteriana
- Eucalyptus wetarensis L.D.Pryor
- Eucalyptus whitei Maiden & Blakely – White's ironbark
- Eucalyptus wilcoxii Boland & Kleinig – Deua gum
- Eucalyptus williamsiana L.A.S.Johnson & K.D.Hill – large-leaved stringybark
- Eucalyptus willisii Ladiges, Humphries & Brooker – shining peppermint, promontory peppermint
- Eucalyptus wimmerensis Rule – Wimmera mallee box, broad-leaved green mallee
- Eucalyptus woodwardii Maiden – lemon-flowered gum, Woodward's blackbutt
- Eucalyptus woollsiana F.Muell. ex R.T.Baker
- Eucalyptus wubinensis L.A.S.Johnson & K.D.Hill
- Eucalyptus wyolensis Boomsma – Wyola mallee

== X ==
- Eucalyptus xanthonema Turcz. – yellow-flowered mallee
  - Eucalyptus xanthonema subsp. apposita Brooker & Hopper
  - Eucalyptus xanthonema Turcz. subsp. xanthonema
- Eucalyptus xerothermica L.A.S.Johnson & K.D.Hill

== Y ==
- Eucalyptus yalatensis Boomsma – Yalata mallee
- Eucalyptus yarraensis Maiden & Cambage in J.H.Maiden – Yarra gum
- Eucalyptus yarriambiack Rule
- Eucalyptus yilgarnensis (Maiden) Brooker – yorrell, yorrel
- Eucalyptus youmanii Blakely & McKie – Youman's stringybark
  - Eucalyptus youmanii var. sphaerocarpa Blakely & McKie
- Eucalyptus youngiana F.Muell. – large-fruited mallee, Ooldea mallee, yarldarlba
- Eucalyptus yumbarrana Boomsma – Yumbarra mallee

== Z ==
- Eucalyptus zopherophloia Brooker & Hopper – blackbutt mallee

== See also ==
- List of Corymbia species
