= Eucalyptus relicta =

Conservation status
- Vulnerable (IUCN 3.1)

- Priority Two — Poorly Known Taxa (DEC)

Scientific classification
- Kingdom: Plantae
- Clade: Tracheophytes
- Clade: Angiosperms
- Clade: Eudicots
- Clade: Rosids
- Order: Myrtales
- Family: Myrtaceae
- Genus: Eucalyptus
- Species: E. relicta

Binomial name
- Eucalyptus relicta Hopper & Ward.-Johnson

Species of eucalyptus

Eucalyptus relicta is a species of mallee that is endemic to a small area in the south west of Western Australia. It has rough bark on the trunk and branches, lance-shaped to curved adult leaves, flower buds in groups of between seven and thirteen and hemispherical to conical or cup-shaped fruit.

== Description ==
Eucalyptus relicta is a tree, sometimes with branches close to the ground, that typically grows to a height of 7–12 m (23–39 ft) and forms a lignotuber. The bark on the trunk and branches is thick, dark grey and fissured. Young plants and coppice regrowth have egg-shaped, pointed leaves. Adult leaves are lance-shaped to curved, glossy dark green but paler on the lower side, 100–153 mm (3.9–6.0 in) long and 15–30 mm (0.59–1.18 in) wide, tapering to a petiole 12–21 mm (0.47–0.83 in) long. The flower buds are arranged in leaf axils in groups of between seven and thirteen on an unbranched peduncle 9–16 mm (0.35–0.63 in) long, the individual buds on pedicels 3–5 mm (0.12–0.20 in) long. Mature buds are oval, 6–10 mm (0.24–0.39 in) long and 4–7 mm (0.16–0.28 in) wide with a conical operculum. Flowering occurs from January to February but the flower colour is not known. The fruit is a woody, hemispherical, conical or cup-shaped capsule 4–6 mm (0.16–0.24 in) long and 7–8 mm (0.28–0.31 in) wide with the valves protruding above the rim of the fruit.

== Taxonomy and naming ==
Eucalyptus relicta was first formally described in 2004 by Stephen Hopper and Greg Wardell-Johnson in the journal Nuytsia from material collected near Sabina Road in the Whicher Range in 1993. The specific epithet (relicta) is from the Latin relictus, meaning "left behind", and "refers to the phlogenetic and landscape position of the species".

== Distribution and habitat ==
This eucalypt is only known from two populations along creeklines on upper, undulating slopes in the Whicher Range.

== Conservation status ==
This tree is classified as "Priority Two" by the Western Australian Government Department of Parks and Wildlife meaning that it is poorly known and from only one or a few locations. The IUCN Red List assesses the species as Vulnerable.

== See also ==
- List of Eucalyptus species
