= Eucalyptus rosacea =

Scientific classification
- Kingdom: Plantae
- Clade: Tracheophytes
- Clade: Angiosperms
- Clade: Eudicots
- Clade: Rosids
- Order: Myrtales
- Family: Myrtaceae
- Genus: Eucalyptus
- Species: E. rosacea

Binomial name
- Eucalyptus rosacea L.A.S.Johnson & K.D.Hill

Species of eucalyptus

Eucalyptus rosacea is a species of mallee that is endemic to Western Australia. It has smooth, greyish bark, linear to narrow oblong adult leaves, flower buds in groups of seven, pink, red or cream-coloured flowers and flattened hemispherical to almost saucer-shaped fruit.

== Description ==
Eucalyptus rosacea is a mallee that typically grows to a height of 4 m (13 ft) and forms a lignotuber. It has smooth greyish bark that is shed in ribbons to reveal pinkish or yellowish new bark. Young plants and coppice regrowth have dull, greyish, linear leaves that are 35–80 mm (1.4–3.1 in) long and 2–4 mm (0.079–0.157 in) wide. Adult leaves are arranged alternately, the same shade of dull greyish to bluish green on both sides, linear to narrow oblong, 60–120 mm (2.4–4.7 in) long and 5–10 mm (0.20–0.39 in) wide, tapering to a petiole 4–10 mm (0.16–0.39 in) long. The flower buds are arranged in leaf axils in groups of seven on an unbranched peduncle 10–30 mm (0.39–1.18 in) long, the individual buds on pedicels 7–10 mm (0.28–0.39 in) long. Mature buds are oval, 11–17 mm (0.43–0.67 in) long and 6–7 mm (0.24–0.28 in) wide with a tapered, horn-like operculum 9–15 mm (0.35–0.59 in) long. Flowering occurs from November to February and the flowers range in colour from white through pink to deep red. The fruit is a woody, flattened hemispherical to almost saucer-shaped capsule 3–5 mm (0.12–0.20 in) long and 6–12 mm (0.24–0.47 in) wide with the valves near rim level or protruding.

== Taxonomy and naming ==
Eucalyptus rosacea was first formally described in 1992 by Lawrie Johnson and Ken Hill in the journal Telopea from material collected near Queen Victoria Spring in 1986. The specific epithet (rosacea) is from the Latin word rosaceus, meaning "like the flower of a single rose", referring to the frequently pink colour of the flowers and bark.

== Distribution and habitat ==
This mallee grows in low, open mallee shrubland in yellow or red sandy soils east of Laverton and Queen Victoria Spring to the edge of the Great Victoria Desert.

== Conservation status ==
This eucalypt is classified as "not threatened" by the Western Australian Government Department of Parks and Wildlife.

== See also ==
- List of Eucalyptus species
