= Eucalyptus misella =

Conservation status
- Priority One — Poorly Known Taxa (DEC)

Scientific classification
- Kingdom: Plantae
- Clade: Tracheophytes
- Clade: Angiosperms
- Clade: Eudicots
- Clade: Rosids
- Order: Myrtales
- Family: Myrtaceae
- Genus: Eucalyptus
- Species: E. misella

Binomial name
- Eucalyptus misella L.A.S.Johnson & K.D.Hill

Species of eucalyptus

Eucalyptus misella is a species of mallee that is endemic to a small area of Western Australia. It has smooth, greyish bark, narrow oblong to narrow elliptical leaves, flower buds in groups of between seven and eleven, white flowers and flattened spherical fruit.

== Description ==
Eucalyptus misella is a mallee that typically grows to a height of 2.5 m (8 ft 2 in) but often less, and forms a lignotuber. It has smooth, dull greyish bark and dense foliage that reaches the ground. Young plants and coppice regrowth have dull bluish green, oblong leaves that are 65–95 mm (2.6–3.7 in) long and 12–15 mm (0.47–0.59 in) wide. Adult leaves are the same shade of bluish green on both sides, narrow oblong to narrow elliptical, 40–85 mm (1.6–3.3 in) long and 8–15 mm (0.31–0.59 in) wide on a petiole 4–8 mm (0.16–0.31 in) long. The flower buds are arranged in groups of seven, nine or eleven in leaf axils on a peduncle 2–5 mm (0.079–0.197 in) long, the individual buds on pedicels 1–3 mm (0.039–0.118 in) long. Mature buds are egg-shaped, about 6 mm (0.24 in) long and about 5 mm (0.20 in) wide with a rounded operculum. Flowering has been recorded in November and the flowers are white. The fruit is a woody, flattened spherical to conical capsule, 4–5 mm (0.16–0.20 in) long and 6–8 mm (0.24–0.31 in) wide with the valves near rim level.

== Taxonomy ==
Eucalyptus misella was first formally described in 1992 by Lawrie Johnson and Ken Hill in the journal Telopea, from a specimen collected near Grasspatch in 1983. The specific epithet (misella) is from the Latin misellus meaning "wretched", referring to its low growth form.

== Distribution and habitat ==
This mallee is common in a small area west of Grasspatch where it grows on sand-plain in heath.

== Conservation status ==
This eucalypt has been classified as "Priority One" by the Government of Western Australia Department of Parks and Wildlife, meaning that it is known from only one or a few locations which are potentially at risk.

== See also ==
- List of Eucalyptus species
