= Eucalyptus tephrodes =

Scientific classification
- Kingdom: Plantae
- Clade: Tracheophytes
- Clade: Angiosperms
- Clade: Eudicots
- Clade: Rosids
- Order: Myrtales
- Family: Myrtaceae
- Genus: Eucalyptus
- Species: E. tephrodes

Binomial name
- Eucalyptus tephrodes L.A.S.Johnson & K.D.Hill

Species of eucalyptus

Eucalyptus tephrodes is a species of small tree or mallee that is endemic to Western Australia. It has rough bark on the trunk and larger branches, smooth bark above, egg-shaped to lance-shaped adult leaves, flower buds in groups of three on the ends of branchlets and cup-shaped to hemispherical fruit.

== Description ==
Eucalyptus tephrodes is a tree or mallee that typically grows to a height of 10–12 m (33–39 ft) and forms a lignotuber. It has rough, fibrous or flaky bark on the trunk and larger branches, smooth and glaucous bark on the branchlets. Young plants and coppice regrowth have glaucous, egg-shaped to round leaves that are 70–95 mm (2.8–3.7 in) long and 4–7 mm (0.16–0.28 in) wide and petiolate. Adult leaves are the same shade of dull, slightly glaucous dull blue on both sides, 70–190 mm (2.8–7.5 in) long and 10–47 mm (0.39–1.85 in) wide tapering to a petiole 10–28 mm (0.39–1.10 in) long. The flower buds are arranged on the ends of branchlets in groups of seven on a branching peduncle 3–17 mm (0.12–0.67 in) long, the individual buds on pedicels 2–5 mm (0.079–0.197 in) long. Mature buds are oval to spindle-shaped, 8–10 mm (0.31–0.39 in) long and 4–5 mm (0.16–0.20 in) wide with a conical or beaked operculum. Flowering has been recorded in November and December. The fruit is a woody cup-shaped to hemispherical capsule 5–9 mm (0.20–0.35 in) long and 5–8 mm (0.20–0.31 in) wide with the valves near rim level.

== Taxonomy and naming ==
Eucalyptus tephrodes was first formally described in 2000 by Lawrie Johnson and Ken Hill in the journal Telopea. The specific epithet is from ancient Greek meaning "ash-grey" and "resembling", referring to the greyish glaucous foliage.

== Distribution and habitat ==
This eucalypt is found among granite outcrops, along creek edges and in savannah woodlands in the south-east Kimberley centred around Halls Creek with a disjunct occurrence in the east Pilbara. It grows in red sandy-loamy soils over granite.

== Conservation status ==
This eucalypt is classified as "not threatened" by the Western Australian Government Department of Parks and Wildlife.

== See also ==
- List of Eucalyptus species
