= Eucalyptus retusa =

Point Hood yate

Conservation status
- Near Threatened (IUCN 3.1)

- Priority One — Poorly Known Taxa (DEC)

Scientific classification
- Kingdom: Plantae
- Clade: Tracheophytes
- Clade: Angiosperms
- Clade: Eudicots
- Clade: Rosids
- Order: Myrtales
- Family: Myrtaceae
- Genus: Eucalyptus
- Species: E. retusa

Binomial name
- Eucalyptus retusa D.Nicolle, French & McQuoid

Species of eucalyptus

Eucalyptus retusa, commonly known as the Point Hood yate, is a species of mallee that is endemic to a restricted area in Western Australia. It has smooth, greyish bark, glossy green, egg-shaped to spatula-shaped adult leaves, flower buds in clusters of between thirteen and nineteen, yellowish green flowers and fruit with their bases fused together.

== Description ==
Eucalyptus retusa is a mallee that typically grows to a height of 0.5–4 m (1 ft 8 in – 13 ft 1 in) and forms a lignotuber. It has smooth, pale grey bark that is cream-coloured when new. Young plants have egg-shaped to more or less round leaves that are dull green, paler on the lower surface, up to 50 mm (2.0 in) long and 40 mm (1.6 in) wide. Adult leaves are glossy green, egg-shaped to spatula-shaped, 30–55 mm (1.2–2.2 in) long and 14–20 mm (0.55–0.79 in) wide, tapering to the petiole. The flower buds are arranged in leaf axils in clusters of between thirteen and nineteen, the buds joined at the base. The operculum is 40–42 mm (1.6–1.7 in) long and 4–6 mm (0.16–0.24 in) wide at the base. The flowers are yellowish green and the fruit are conical, 7–10.5 mm (0.28–0.41 in) wide and fused at the base, the fused fruit 30 mm (1.2 in) in diameter.

== Taxonomy and naming ==
Eucalyptus retusa was first formally described in 2008 by Dean Nicolle, Malcolm French and Nathan McQuoid from a specimen collected near Bremer Bay in 2004. The description was published in the journal Nuytsia. The specific epithet (retusa) is from the Latin retusus meaning blunted, rounded, notched at the tip.

== Distribution and habitat ==
The Point Hood yate is only known from a single population at the type location near Bremer Bay where it grows in low scrubland on a rocky headland.

== Conservation status ==
This eucalypt is classified as "Priority One" by the Government of Western Australia Department of Parks and Wildlife, meaning that it is known from only one or a few locations which are potentially at risk. The IUCN Red List assesses the species as Near Threatened.

== See also ==
- List of Eucalyptus species
