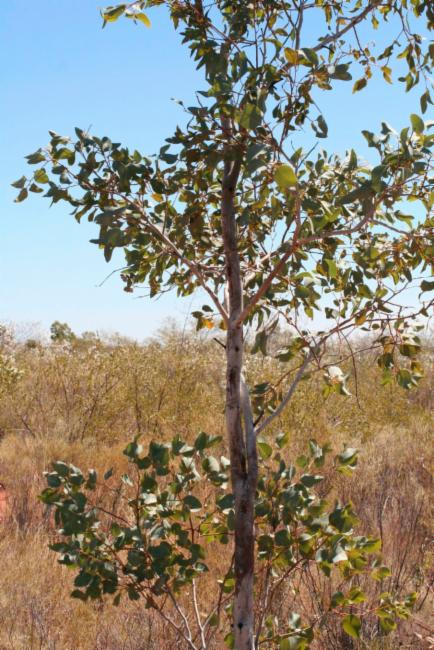
- Eucalyptus pantoleuca in the Mueller Ranges

Scientific classification
- Kingdom: Plantae
- Clade: Tracheophytes
- Clade: Angiosperms
- Clade: Eudicots
- Clade: Rosids
- Order: Myrtales
- Family: Myrtaceae
- Genus: Eucalyptus
- Species: E. pantoleuca

Binomial name
- Eucalyptus pantoleuca L.A.S.Johnson & K.D.Hill

= Eucalyptus pantoleuca =

Round-leaved gum

Species of eucalyptus

Eucalyptus pantoleuca, commonly known as round-leaved gum or Panton River white gum, is a species of small tree that is endemic to the Kimberley region of Western Australia. It has smooth, powdery bark, more or less round adult leaves, flower buds in groups of three, white flowers and conical fruit that are glaucous at first.

== Description ==
Eucalyptus pantoleuca is an often straggly tree that typically grows to a height of 5–12 m (16–39 ft) and forms a lignotuber. It has smooth, powdery white bark that is pale pink to pale orange when new. Young plants and coppice regrowth have stems that are more or less square in cross-section with a wing on each corner and more or less round leaves 95–150 mm (3.7–5.9 in) long and 100–155 mm (3.9–6.1 in) wide arranged in opposite pairs. Adult leaves are also arranged in opposite pairs, more or less round, triangular or egg-shaped, the same shade of dull, glaucous green on both sides, 90–150 mm (3.5–5.9 in) long and 70–160 mm (2.8–6.3 in) wide on a flattened petiole 15–35 mm (0.59–1.38 in) long. The flower buds are arranged in leaf axils in groups of three on an unbranched peduncle 10–20 mm (0.39–0.79 in) long, the individual buds sessile or on very short pedicels. Mature buds are oval to spindle-shaped, glaucous, 14–25 mm (0.55–0.98 in) long and 13–22 mm (0.51–0.87 in) wide with a rounded operculum. Flowering occurs in July or November and the flowers are white or yellow. The fruit is a woody, conical capsule that is glaucous at first, 9–15 mm (0.35–0.59 in) long and 15–24 mm (0.59–0.94 in) wide with the valves protruding strongly.

== Taxonomy ==
Eucalyptus pantoleuca was first described in 2000 by Lawrie Johnson and Ken Hill in the journal Telopea from material Johnson collected near 'Tableland' homestead in 1967. The specific epithet (pantoleuca) is from ancient Greek meaning "entirely white".

== Distribution and habitat ==
Round-leaved gum is found along creeks and on hillsides in the Kimberley region of Western Australia where it grows in sandy-loam alluvial soils in low-lying areas or gentle slopes.

== Conservation status ==
This eucalypt is classified as "not threatened" by the Western Australian Government Department of Parks and Wildlife.

== See also ==
- List of Eucalyptus species
