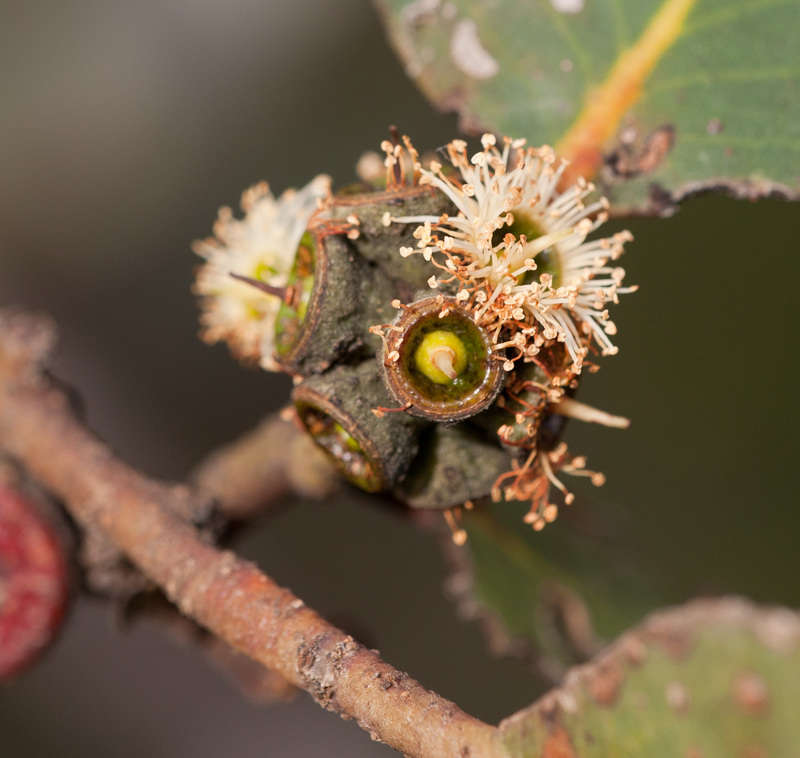
- Flower of Eucalyptus serrawnsis

Scientific classification
- Kingdom: Plantae
- Clade: Embryophytes
- Clade: Tracheophytes
- Clade: Spermatophytes
- Clade: Angiosperms
- Clade: Eudicots
- Clade: Rosids
- Order: Myrtales
- Family: Myrtaceae
- Genus: Eucalyptus
- Species: E. serraensis

Binomial name
- Eucalyptus serraensis Ladiges & Whiffin

= Eucalyptus serraensis =

Grampians stringybark

Species of eucalyptus

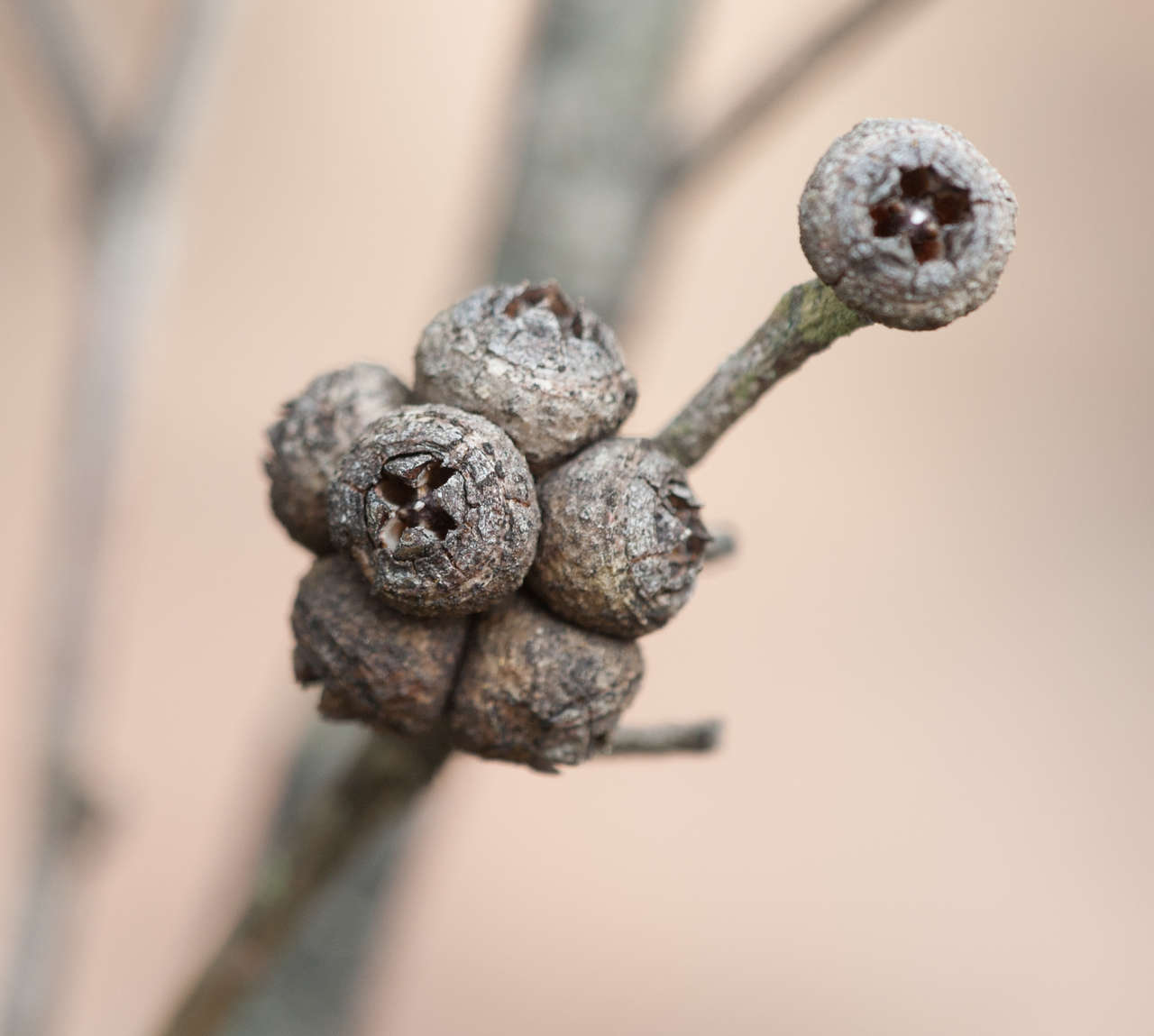
Fruit

Eucalyptus serraensis, commonly known as the Grampians stringybark, is a species of small tree or mallee that is endemic to the Grampians in Victoria, Australia. It has rough, stringy, fibrous or flaky bark on the trunk and sometimes also the branches, smooth bark above, lance-shaped to egg-shaped or round adult leaves, sessile flower buds in groups of three or seven, white flowers and hemispherical or cup-shaped fruit.

== Description ==
Eucalyptus serraensis is a tree or a mallee, that typically grows to a height of 5 m (16 ft) and forms a lignotuber. It has rough, stringy, fibrous or flaky bark on some or all of the trunk and sometimes also the branches, smooth pale grey to brownish bark above. Young plants and coppice regrowth have glossy green, egg-shaped to round leaves that are 44–70 mm (1.7–2.8 in) long and 45–58 mm (1.8–2.3 in) wide. Adult leaves are the same shade of glossy green on both sides, round, egg-shaped, elliptical or lance-shaped, 50–130 mm (2.0–5.1 in) long and 20–70 mm (0.79–2.76 in) wide on a petiole 10–30 mm (0.39–1.18 in) long. The flower buds are arranged in leaf axils in groups of three or seven on an unbranched peduncle up to 3 mm (0.12 in) long, the individual buds sessile. Mature buds are warty, oval to spherical, 6–15 mm (0.24–0.59 in) long and 5–10 mm (0.20–0.39 in) wide with a conical to rounded or flattened operculum. Flowering occurs from April to November and the flowers are white. The fruit is a sessile, woody, hemispherical or cup-shaped capsule 6–17 mm (0.24–0.67 in) long and 10–20 mm (0.39–0.79 in) wide with the valves usually protruding.

== Taxonomy and naming ==
Eucalyptus serraensis was first formally described in 1993 by Pauline Ladiges and Trevor Paul Whiffin in Australian Systematic Botany, based on plant material collected from a rocky outcrop near Sundial Turntable in Grampians National Park. The specific epithet (serraensis) refers to the Serra Range in Victoria, where the species occurs.

== Distribution and habitat ==
Grampians stringybark grows in very rocky sites on the Serra and Wonderland Ranges in the Grampians National Park.

== See also ==
- List of Eucalyptus species
