= Eucalyptus splendens =

Apple jack

Conservation status
- Endangered (IUCN 3.1)

Scientific classification
- Kingdom: Plantae
- Clade: Tracheophytes
- Clade: Angiosperms
- Clade: Eudicots
- Clade: Rosids
- Order: Myrtales
- Family: Myrtaceae
- Genus: Eucalyptus
- Species: E. splendens

Binomial name
- Eucalyptus splendens Rule

Species of eucalyptus

Eucalyptus splendens, commonly known as apple jack, is a species of small, spreading tree that is endemic to a small area of Victoria, Australia. It has fibrous or corky bark on the trunk and thicker branches, lance-shaped to curved adult leaves, flower buds in groups of seven, white flowers and hemispherical to cup-shaped fruit.

== Description ==
Eucalyptus splendens is a tree that typically grows to a height of 10 m (33 ft) and forms a lignotuber. It has rough, firm to corky fibrous bark on the trunk and larger branches, smooth light brown bark on the thin branches. The branchlets are conspicuously yellow. Young plants and coppice regrowth have stems that are square in cross-section and leaves that are glossy green, lance-shaped, 45–90 mm (1.8–3.5 in) long and 10–25 mm (0.39–0.98 in) wide. Adult leaves are lance-shaped to curved, 100–250 mm (3.9–9.8 in) long and 15–25 mm (0.59–0.98 in) wide on a petiole 10–30 mm (0.39–1.18 in) long. The flower buds are arranged in leaf axils in groups of seven on an unbranched peduncle 4–6 mm (0.16–0.24 in) long, the individual buds on pedicels 1–4 mm (0.039–0.157 in) long. Mature buds are oval to spindle-shaped, about 5 mm (0.20 in) long and 2–33 mm (0.079–1.299 in) wide with a conical operculum. The flowers are white and the fruit is a woody, hemispherical to cup-shaped capsule 5–6 mm (0.20–0.24 in) long and 5–8 mm (0.20–0.31 in) wide with the valves protruding.

== Taxonomy and naming ==
Eucalyptus splendens was first formally described in 1996 by Kevin James Rule in the journal Muelleria. The specific epithet (splendens) is a Latin word meaning "shining", "gleaming" or brilliant", referring to the bright green juvenile leaves.

== Distribution ==
This eucalypt is only known from a single location near Mount Richmond, north-west of Portland, where it grows in heavy soils of volcanic origin.

== See also ==
- List of Eucalyptus species
