= Eucalyptus victoriana =

Scientific classification
- Kingdom: Plantae
- Clade: Tracheophytes
- Clade: Angiosperms
- Clade: Eudicots
- Clade: Rosids
- Order: Myrtales
- Family: Myrtaceae
- Genus: Eucalyptus
- Species: E. victoriana

Binomial name
- Eucalyptus victoriana Ladiges & Whiffin

Species of eucalyptus

Eucalyptus victoriana is a species of small to medium-sized tree that is endemic to the Grampians in Victoria, Australia. It has rough, stringy bark on part of the trunk, egg-shaped to lance-shaped adult leaves, flower buds in groups of seven to eleven, white flowers and cup-shaped to hemispherical fruit.

== Description ==
Eucalyptus victoriana is a tree that grows to a height of 20 m (66 ft), sometimes much less, and forms a lignotuber. It has rough, stringy bark on part of the trunk, smooth pale grey and creamy white above. Adult leaves are egg-shaped to elliptical or lance-shaped, 72–150 mm (2.8–5.9 in) long and 20–55 mm (0.79–2.17 in) wide, tapering to a petiole 9–24 mm (0.35–0.94 in) long. The flower buds are arranged in leaf axils in groups of seven to eleven on a thick, unbranched peduncle up to 5 mm (0.20 in) long, the individual buds sessile. Mature buds are warty, oval, about 9 mm (0.35 in) long and 6 mm (0.24 in) wide with a conical to rounded operculum. The flowers are white and the fruit is a woody cup-shaped to hemispherical capsule 5–6 mm (0.20–0.24 in) long and 10–14 mm (0.39–0.55 in) wide with the valves at rim level or prominently protruding.

== Taxonomy and naming ==
Eucalyptus victoriana was first formally described in 1993 by Pauline Y. Ladiges and Trevor Paul Whiffin in Australian Systematic Botany from specimens collected on Mount Thackeray in the Grampians National Park in 1987. The specific epithet (victoriana) is a reference to the Victoria Range in the state of Victoria.

== Distribution ==
This eucalypt has a restricted in the Grampians area.

== See also ==
- List of Eucalyptus species
