= Eucalyptus luculenta =

Conservation status
- Near Threatened (IUCN 3.1)

- Priority Two — Poorly Known Taxa (DEC)

Scientific classification
- Kingdom: Plantae
- Clade: Tracheophytes
- Clade: Angiosperms
- Clade: Eudicots
- Clade: Rosids
- Order: Myrtales
- Family: Myrtaceae
- Genus: Eucalyptus
- Species: E. luculenta

Binomial name
- Eucalyptus luculenta L.A.S.Johnson & K.D.Hill

Species of eucalyptus

Eucalyptus luculenta is a species of mallee that is endemic to a small area on the south coast of Western Australia. It has smooth bark, lance-shaped to egg-shaped leaves, flower buds in groups of seven, pale yellow to white flowers and cup-shaped, barrel-shaped or cylindrical fruit.

== Description ==
Eucalyptus luculenta is a mallee that typically grows to a height of 5 m (16 ft) and forms a lignotuber. It has smooth greyish to pink powdery bark on the trunk and branches. Young plants and coppice regrowth have stems that are more or less square in cross-section and sessile, broadly lance-shaped leaves that are 60–150 mm (2.4–5.9 in) long and 25–45 mm (0.98–1.77 in) wide. Adult leaves are arranged alternately, the same dull greyish green on both sides, lance-shaped to egg-shaped, 60–160 mm (2.4–6.3 in) long and 15–35 mm (0.59–1.38 in) wide, tapering to a petiole 14–40 mm (0.55–1.57 in) long. The flower buds are arranged in leaf axils in groups of seven on an unbranched peduncle 7–14 mm (0.28–0.55 in) long, the individual buds on pedicels 4–10 mm (0.16–0.39 in) long. Mature buds are oval to pear-shaped, 14–19 mm (0.55–0.75 in) long and 6–9 mm (0.24–0.35 in) wide with a beaked operculum 9–14 mm (0.35–0.55 in) long. Flowering has been observed in October and November and the flowers are pale yellow to white. The fruit is a woody, cup-shaped, barrel-shaped or cylindrical capsule with the valves protruding above the level of the rim. The fruit have a waxy coating but are markedly glossy underneath.

== Taxonomy and naming ==
Eucalyptus luculenta was first formally described in 1999 by Lawrie Johnson and Ken Hill from a specimen collected by Johnson in 1983 between the Balladonia Roadhouse and Mount Ragged. The description was published in the journal Telopea. The specific epithet (luculenta) is a Latin word meaning "full of light" or "bright", referring to the glossiness of the fruit underneath a waxy coating.

== Distribution and habitat ==
This eucalypt is confined to the Mount Ragged area where it grows in sandy calcareous soils.

== Conservation status ==
This eucalypt is classified as "Priority Two" by the Western Australian Government Department of Parks and Wildlife. meaning that it is poorly known and from only one or a few locations.

== See also ==
- List of Eucalyptus species
