= Eucalyptus glomericassis =

Scarp white gum

Scientific classification
- Kingdom: Plantae
- Clade: Tracheophytes
- Clade: Angiosperms
- Clade: Eudicots
- Clade: Rosids
- Order: Myrtales
- Family: Myrtaceae
- Genus: Eucalyptus
- Species: E. glomericassis

Binomial name
- Eucalyptus glomericassis L.A.S.Johnson & K.D.Hill

Species of eucalyptus

Eucalyptus glomericassis, commonly known as scarp white gum, is a species of small tree that is endemic to the Northern Territory. It has smooth bark, lance-shaped to curved adult leaves, flower buds in groups of seven, white flowers and conical fruit.

== Description ==
Eucalyptus glomericassis is a tree that typically grows to a height of 10 m (33 ft) and forms a lignotuber. It has smooth white or grey bark that is shed to reveal pale pink to pale orange new bark. The adult leaves are lance-shaped or curved, the same glossy green on both sides, 12–25 mm (0.47–0.98 in) long and 10–20 mm (0.39–0.79 in) wide on a petiole 10–30 mm (0.39–1.18 in) long. The flower buds are arranged in leaf axils in groups of seven on an unbranched peduncle 8–16 mm (0.31–0.63 in) long, the individual buds on pedicels 2–3 mm (0.079–0.118 in) long. Mature buds are oval, 7–9 mm (0.28–0.35 in) long and 5–6 mm (0.20–0.24 in) wide with a conical to rounded operculum. Flowering has been recorded in January and the flowers are white. The fruit is a woody conical capsule 4–6 mm (0.16–0.24 in) long and 6–9 mm (0.24–0.35 in) wide with the vales protruding well above the rim.

== Taxonomy and naming ==
Eucalyptus glomericassis was first formally described in 2000 by Lawrie Johnson and Ken Hill in the journal Telopea. The type specimen was collected in 1977 from Deaf Adder Gorge by Clyde Dunlop. The specific epithet glomericassis is "from Latin glomus, glomeris a ball and cassis a helmet, referring to the shape of the calyptra".

== Distribution and habitat ==
Scarp white gum grows near the edges of the sandstone plateau, often near watercourses, in Kakadu National Park and western Arnhem Land.

== See also ==
- List of Eucalyptus species
