= Eucalyptus semota =

Marymia mallee

Conservation status
- Priority One — Poorly Known Taxa (DEC)

- Vulnerable (IUCN 3.1)

Scientific classification
- Kingdom: Plantae
- Clade: Tracheophytes
- Clade: Angiosperms
- Clade: Eudicots
- Clade: Rosids
- Order: Myrtales
- Family: Myrtaceae
- Genus: Eucalyptus
- Species: E. semota

Binomial name
- Eucalyptus semota C.J.Macph. & Grayling

Species of eucalyptus

Eucalyptus semota, commonly known as marymia mallee, is a species of mallee or small tree that is endemic to a small area in central Western Australia. It has rough, flaky to fibrous bark on the trunk, smooth grey or brown bark above, linear to narrow lance-shaped leaves, flower buds in groups of seven or nine, white flowers and conical to cup-shaped fruit.

== Description ==
Eucalyptus semota is a tree or mallee that typically grows to a height of 8 m (26 ft) and forms a lignotuber. It has rough, flaky to fibrous, grey to black bark on some or all of the trunk, smooth grey to brown bark above. Young plants and coppice regrowth have stems that are square in cross-section and dull greyish green, narrow lance-shaped leaves that are 50–100 mm (2.0–3.9 in) long and 5–13 mm (0.20–0.51 in) wide. Adult leaves are the same shade of glossy dark green on both sides, linear to narrow lance-shaped, 60–90 mm (2.4–3.5 in) long and 4–12 mm (0.16–0.47 in) wide, tapering to a petiole 4–13 mm (0.16–0.51 in) long. The flower buds are arranged in leaf axils in groups of seven or nine on a flattened peduncle 5–11 mm (0.20–0.43 in) long, the individual buds on pedicels 1–2 mm (0.039–0.079 in) long. Mature buds are cylindrical to oval, 4–6 mm (0.16–0.24 in) long and 3–5 mm (0.12–0.20 in) wide with a conical to flattened hemispherical operculum. The flowers are white and the fruit is a woody, conical to cup-shaped capsule 4–5 mm (0.16–0.20 in) long and wide with the valves below rim level.

== Taxonomy and naming ==
Eucalyptus semota was first described in 1996 by Carol J. Macpherson and Peter M. Grayling from specimens collected by Macpherson near Marymia Hill north east of Kumarina. The specific epithet (semota) is from the Latin word semotus meaning "remote", referring to the geographic isolation of this species from its near relatives in the series Loxophlebae.

== Distribution and habitat ==
Marymia mallee is known from three separate population between Marymia Hill and Kumarina where it grows in clay soils in gullies.

== Conservation status ==
This eucalypt is classified as "Priority One" by the Government of Western Australia Department of Parks and Wildlife, meaning that it is known from only one or a few locations which are potentially at risk. In 2019 the International Union for the Conservation of Nature listed E. semota]] as a vulnerable species noting that only 1,700 individuals remain spread over three locations.

== See also ==
- List of Eucalyptus species
