= Eucalyptus planipes =

Scientific classification
- Kingdom: Plantae
- Clade: Tracheophytes
- Clade: Angiosperms
- Clade: Eudicots
- Clade: Rosids
- Order: Myrtales
- Family: Myrtaceae
- Genus: Eucalyptus
- Species: E. planipes

Binomial name
- Eucalyptus planipes L.A.S.Johnson & K.D.Hill

Species of eucalyptus

Eucalyptus planipes is a species of mallee that is endemic to Western Australia. It has smooth bark, lance-shaped adult leaves, flower buds in groups of three and conical fruit.

== Description ==
Eucalyptus planipes is a mallee that typically grows to a height of 3–8 m (9.8–26.2 ft) and has smooth white or pale grey bark. Young plants have greyish green, broadly lance-shaped leaves that are up to 70 mm (2.8 in) long and 25 mm (0.98 in) wide. Adult leaves are glossy bright green, lance-shaped or curved, 50–140 mm (2.0–5.5 in) long and 8–30 mm (0.31–1.18 in) wide on a more or less flattened petiole 9–25 mm (0.35–0.98 in) long. The flower buds are arranged in leaf axils in groups of three, on a flattened peduncle 8–16 mm (0.31–0.63 in) long, the individual buds on strongly flattened pedicels 2–12 mm (0.079–0.472 in) long. Mature buds are pear-shaped to club-shaped, 11–16 mm (0.43–0.63 in) long and 9–13 mm (0.35–0.51 in) wide with a conical to limpet-shaped, ribbed operculum less than half as long as the floral cup. The fruit is a woody, conical, ribbed capsule 8–15 mm (0.31–0.59 in) long and 8–14 mm (0.31–0.55 in) wide with the valves near rim level.

== Taxonomy ==
Eucalyptus planipes was first formally described in 2001 by Lawrie Johnson and Ken Hill in the journal Telopea from material collected near Coolgardie in 1983. The specific epithet (planipes) means "flat foot", referring to the pedicels.

== Distribution and habitat ==
This mallee is found on low rises, sandplains and the open woodlands in an area to the south and west of Kalgoorlie, from Norseman to the west of Coolgardie, where it grows in shallow calcareous loam soils over dolerite.

== Conservation status ==
This eucalypt is classified as "not threatened" by the Western Australian Government Department of Parks and Wildlife.

== See also ==
- List of Eucalyptus species
