= Eucalyptus × nowraensis =

Scientific classification
- Kingdom: Plantae
- Clade: Tracheophytes
- Clade: Angiosperms
- Clade: Eudicots
- Clade: Rosids
- Order: Myrtales
- Family: Myrtaceae
- Genus: Eucalyptus
- Species: E. × nowraensis

Binomial name
- Eucalyptus × nowraensis Maiden

Species of eucalyptus

Eucalyptus × nowraensis is a species of tree with smooth bark and lance-shaped leaves that are the same shade of green on both sides, 100–140 mm (3.9–5.5 in) long and 20–25 mm (0.79–0.98 in) wide. The flower buds are smooth and arranged in groups of three or seven with a conical to hemispherical operculum. The fruit is urn-shaped, 15–18 mm (0.59–0.71 in) long and 10–13 mm (0.39–0.51 in) wide on a thick peduncle 7–15 mm (0.28–0.59 in) long. It was first described in 1924 by Joseph Maiden who gave it the name Eucalyptus nowraensis from specimens collected near Nowra by "Mr. Alexander Joseph Gallagher". The description was published Maiden's book, A Critical Revision of the Genus Eucalyptus.

In 1988, George Chippendale listed E. nowraensis as a "reputed hybrid between E. gummifera and E. maculata" (now known as Corymbia gummifera and C. maculata respectively) in Volume 19 of Flora of Australia.

The name Eucalyptus × nowraensis is accepted by the Australian Plant Census.
