= Eucalyptus × tokwa =

Scientific classification
- Kingdom: Plantae
- Clade: Tracheophytes
- Clade: Angiosperms
- Clade: Eudicots
- Clade: Rosids
- Order: Myrtales
- Family: Myrtaceae
- Genus: Eucalyptus
- Species: E. × tokwa

Binomial name
- Eucalyptus × tokwa D.J.Carr & S.G.M.Carr

Species of eucalyptus

Eucalyptus × tokwa is a species of tree that is endemic to Queensland. Eucalyptus tokwa was first formally described in 1987 by Denis John Carr and Stella Grace Maisie Carr from specimens collected "about 6 km from Tokwa on [the] old road from Morehead, Western District, Papua-New Guinea". The description was published in Eucalyptus II - The rubber cuticle, and other studies of the Corymbosae. In 1995, Ken Hill and Lawrie Johnson suggested that E. × tokwa is a hybrid between Corymbia latifolia and C. novoguinensis and that interpretation is accepted by the Australian Plant Census.
