= Eucalyptus × urnularis =

Scientific classification
- Kingdom: Plantae
- Clade: Tracheophytes
- Clade: Angiosperms
- Clade: Eudicots
- Clade: Rosids
- Order: Myrtales
- Family: Myrtaceae
- Genus: Eucalyptus
- Species: E. × urnularis

Binomial name
- Eucalyptus × urnularis D.J.Carr & S.G.M.Carr

Species of eucalyptus

Eucalyptus × urnularis is a species of small tree that is endemic to the Northern Territory. It typically grows to a height of 6 m (20 ft) and has rough, flaky brownish bark on the trunk, smooth grey bark above. The adult leaves are arranged alternately, the same shade of green on both sides, broadly lance-shaped to curved, 120–180 mm (4.7–7.1 in) long and 14–22 mm (0.55–0.87 in) wide on a petiole 13–27 mm (0.51–1.06 in) long. The flower buds are arranged in leaf axils in groups of seven on an unbranched peduncle 5–17 mm (0.20–0.67 in) long, the individual buds on pedicels 3–5 mm (0.12–0.20 in) long. The fruit is an urn-shaped capsule 12–16 mm (0.47–0.63 in) long and 10–14 mm (0.39–0.55 in) wide.

Eucalyptus × urnularis was first formally described in 1985 by Denis John Carr and Stella Grace Maisie Carr from specimens collected "6.8 km north-west of the El Sharana mine" in 1973. The description was published in Eucalyptus 1 – New or little-known species of the Corymbosae. In Flora of Australia, George Chippendale described this as "a newly described taxon which has not been fully evaluated".
