= Eucalyptus × alpina =

Grampians gum

Scientific classification
- Kingdom: Plantae
- Clade: Tracheophytes
- Clade: Angiosperms
- Clade: Eudicots
- Clade: Rosids
- Order: Myrtales
- Family: Myrtaceae
- Genus: Eucalyptus
- Species: E. × alpina

Binomial name
- Eucalyptus × alpina Lindl.

Species of eucalyptus

Eucalyptus × alpina, commonly known as Grampians gum, is a mallee or small tree that is endemic to the Grampians in Victoria, Australia. It has fibrous grey bark near its base and smooth greyish bark higher up. The leaves are broadly lance-shaped to egg-shaped and the plant has very warty buds and fruit. There is disagreement about its name, the Royal Botanic Gardens Victoria referring to it as the Mt Abrupt stringybark.

== Description ==
Eucalyptus × alpina is a mallee that grows to 2 m (7 ft) high or a tree to 10 m (30 ft). It has fibrous grey bark on its trunk and lower stems and smooth greyish bark further up. The leaves on young plants are broadly egg-shaped to more or less circular and the same dark green on both sides. Adult leaves are broadly lance-shaped to egg-shaped, dark green on both sides, 75–100 mm (3.0–3.9 in) long and 25–38 mm (0.98–1.5 in) wide with a thick, channelled petiole 10–20 mm (0.4–0.8 in) long. The flowers are arranged in groups of between three and seven on a thick, flattened peduncle 2–5 mm (0.08–0.2 in) long. The flower buds lack a pedicel and are oval to more or less spherical and very warty. The floral cup is 6–8 mm (0.2–0.3 in) long and 7–9 mm (0.28–0.35 in) wide and the operculum is hemispherical, 4–5 mm (0.16–0.20 in) long and 5–9 mm (0.2–0.4 in) wide. The fruit is a very warty capsule 12–16 mm (0.47–0.63 in) long and 15–18 mm (0.59–0.71 in) wide.

== Taxonomy and naming ==
Eucalyptus × alpina was first formally described in 1838 by botanist John Lindley and the description was published in Thomas Mitchell's Three Expeditions into the interior of Eastern Australia based on plant material collected during his 1836 expedition. The Royal Botanic Gardens Victoria gives this species the name E. verrucata P.Ladiges & Whiffin, the Mt Abrupt stringybark.

== Distribution and habitat ==
Grampians gum mostly grows in pure stands on the higher parts of the Grampians National Park.
