= Eucalyptus orophila =

Conservation status
- Critically Endangered (IUCN 3.1)

Scientific classification
- Kingdom: Plantae
- Clade: Tracheophytes
- Clade: Angiosperms
- Clade: Eudicots
- Clade: Rosids
- Order: Myrtales
- Family: Myrtaceae
- Genus: Eucalyptus
- Species: E. orophila

Binomial name
- Eucalyptus orophila L.D.Pryor

Species of eucalyptus

Eucalyptus orophila is a species of small tree or shrub that is endemic to East Timor. It has rough, scaly, flaky bark on the lower part of the trunk, smooth bark above, egg-shaped to lance-shaped adult leaves, flower buds in groups of seven, white flowers and barrel-shaped to bell-shaped fruit.

== Description ==
Eucalyptus orophila a tree that typically grows to a height of 14.5 m (48 ft), or a shrub to 2 m (6 ft 7 in) on higher, exposed sites. The bark is rough, scaly and flaky near the base, smooth and grey above. The adult leaves are paler on the lower surface, egg-shaped to lance-shaped, 80–100 mm (3.1–3.9 in) long, 30–40 mm (1.2–1.6 in) wide on a petiole 20–25 mm (0.79–0.98 in) long. The flowers are arranged in leaf axils in groups of seven on a flattened, unbranched peduncle up to 20 mm (0.79 in) long, the individual buds on pedicels 5–10 mm (0.20–0.39 in) long. The mature buds are 8–12 mm (0.31–0.47 in) long, 7–8 mm (0.28–0.31 in) wide with a hemispherical operculum that less than half the length of the floral cup. The flowers are white and the fruit is a woody, barrel-shaped to bell-shaped capsule, 7–10 mm (0.28–0.39 in) long and wide with the valves near rim level or below.

== Taxonomy and naming ==
Eucalyptus orophila was first formally described in 1995 by Lindsay Pryor from specimens collected near the summit of Mount Tata Mailau in East Timor and the description was published in Australian Systematic Botany. It is similar to E. urophylla but has leaves with a rounded rather than a pointed tip.

== Distribution ==
This eucalypt is one of only four species only occurring outside Australia. It is only known from East Timor.
