= Eucalyptus wetarensis =

Conservation status
- Near Threatened (IUCN 3.1)

Scientific classification
- Kingdom: Plantae
- Clade: Tracheophytes
- Clade: Angiosperms
- Clade: Eudicots
- Clade: Rosids
- Order: Myrtales
- Family: Myrtaceae
- Genus: Eucalyptus
- Species: E. wetarensis

Binomial name
- Eucalyptus wetarensis L.D.Pryor

Species of eucalyptus

Eucalyptus wetarensis is a species of tree that is endemic to Wetar Island in Indonesia. It has rough, fibrous bark on the trunk and larger branches, lance-shaped or curved adult leaves, flower buds in groups of seven and bell-shaped to barrel-shaped fruit.

== Description ==
Eucalyptus wetarensis is a tree that grows to a height of 10–17 m (33–56 ft) and has rough, fibrous bark on its trunk and larger branches. Young plants and coppice regrowth have egg-shaped to lance-shaped leaves that are slightly paler on the lower surface, 60–115 mm (2.4–4.5 in) long, 40–65 mm (1.6–2.6 in) wide. Adult leaves are paler on the lower surface, lance-shaped, slightly curved, 120–140 mm (4.7–5.5 in) long and 25–35 mm (0.98–1.38 in) wide on a petiole 20–23 mm (0.79–0.91 in) long. The flowers are arranged in leaf axils in groups of seven on a strap-like, unbranched peduncle 12–17 mm (0.47–0.67 in) long, the individual buds on pedicels 5–8 mm (0.20–0.31 in) long. The mature buds are 10–15 mm (0.39–0.59 in) long, 5–7 mm (0.20–0.28 in) wide with a hemispherical to conical operculum that is about the same length as the floral cup. The fruit is a woody, bell-shaped to barrel-shaped capsule, 8–14 mm (0.31–0.55 in) long and 8–15 mm (0.31–0.59 in) wide.

== Taxonomy and naming ==
Eucalyptus wetarensis was first formally described in 1995 by Lindsay Pryor from specimens collected near Carbubu Village on Wetar Island and the description was published in Australian Systematic Botany. It is similar to E. urophylla but has narrower leaves, shorter opercula and larger fruit.

== Distribution ==
This eucalypt is one of only four species only occurring outside Australia. It is only known from Wetar island, one of the Lesser Sunda Islands of Indonesia.
