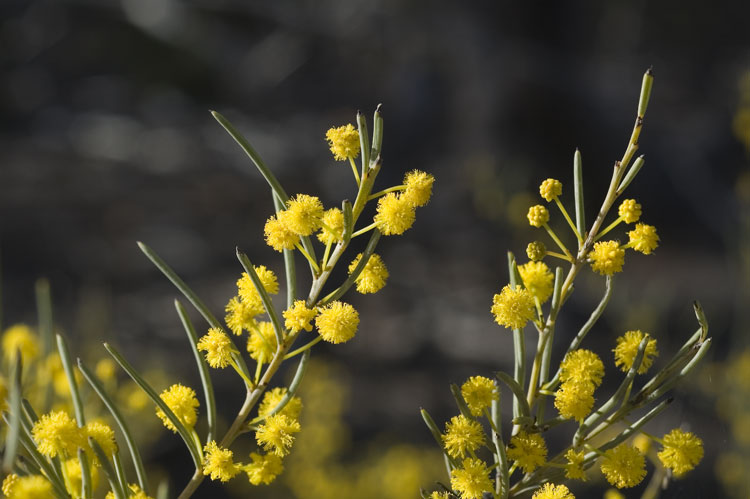
- Subsp. angustifolia in the Nuytsland Nature Reserve

Scientific classification
- Kingdom: Plantae
- Clade: Tracheophytes
- Clade: Angiosperms
- Clade: Eudicots
- Clade: Rosids
- Order: Fabales
- Family: Fabaceae
- Subfamily: Caesalpinioideae
- Clade: Mimosoid clade
- Genus: Acacia
- Species: A. mutabilis

Binomial name
- Acacia mutabilis Maslin
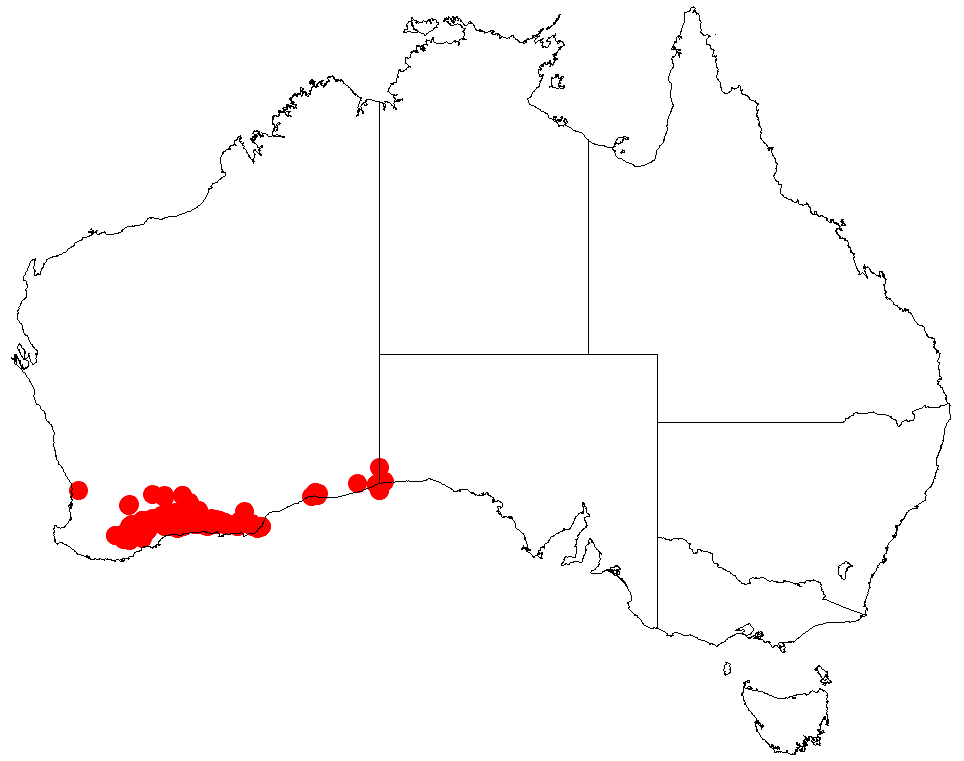
- Occurrence data from AVH

Synonyms
- Racosperma mutabile (Maslin) Pedley

= Acacia mutabilis =

Species of legume

Acacia mutabilis is a species of flowering plant in the family Fabaceae, and is endemic to the south of Western Australia. It is a shrub with variably shaped, but often linear to lance-shaped phyllodes with the narrower end towards the base, spherical heads of golden yellow flowers and thinly leathery curved or coiled pods.

== Description ==
Acacia mutabilis is a shrub that typically grows to a height of 0.3–2 m (1 ft 0 in – 6 ft 7 in) with glabrous branchlets or covered with minute hairs, pressed against the surface. The phyllodes are variably shaped, but often linear to lance-shaped with the narrower end towards the base, straight to curved, flat to subterete or four-sided in cross-section, 15–55 mm (0.59–2.17 in) long, 1–8 mm (0.039–0.315 in) wide, green to grey-green with five veins and one prominent vein on each face and leathery. There is a gland 1–15 mm (0.039–0.591 in) above the pulvinus and sometimes stipules at the base. The flowers are borne in two spherical heads in axils on peduncles 3–18 mm (0.12–0.71 in) long, each head 4–5 mm (0.16–0.20 in) in diameter with 16 to 32 golden yellow flowers. Flowering occurs from August to October, and the pods are curved to coiled, more or less terete, up to 70 mm (2.8 in) long, 2–3 mm (0.079–0.118 in) wide, thinly leathery black, glabrous, and sometimes constricted between the seeds.

== Taxonomy ==
Acacia mutabilis was first formally described in 1999 by Bruce Maslin in the journal Nuytsia from specimens collected east of Scaddan in 1970. The specific epithet (mutabilis) means 'changeable', referring to the great variation in the species.

In the same journal, Maslin described five subspecies of A. mutabilis, and the names are accepted by the Australian Plant Census:

- Acacia mutabilis subsp. angustifolia Maslin has phyllodes 1–2 mm (0.039–0.079 in) wide, subterete to five sided in cross-section, and rarely flat.
- Acacia mutabilis subsp. incurva Maslin has phyllodes with a pointed or rounded end, often narrowed at the end, and distinctly incurved, 3–6 mm (0.12–0.24 in) long and a gland 1–5 mm (0.039–0.197 in) above the pulvinus.
- Acacia mutabilis Maslin subsp. mutabilis has phyllodes with a pointed or rounded end, straight to shallowly curved, or if shallowly curved then gland further from the pulvinus and/or longer peduncles, the stipules fallen early.
- Acacia mutabilis subsp. rhynchophylla Maslin has phyllodes 4–8 mm (0.16–0.31 in) wide with a rounded end, and a beak-shaped point on the side.
- Acacia mutabilis subsp. stipulifera Maslin has phyllodes with a pointed or rounded end, straight to shallowly curved, or if shallowly curved then gland further from the pulvinus and/or longer peduncles, and stipules 2–3 mm (0.079–0.118 in) long and 0.5–0.7 mm (0.020–0.028 in) wide.

== Distribution and habitat ==
This species of wattle occurs in southern Western Australia from Gnowangerup and east to the South Australian border where it grows on sand dunes, undulating plains, depressions and margins of salt lakes in sandy, calcareous clay, gravelly to loamy soils, in the Avon Wheatbelt, Coolgardie, Esperance Plains, Hampton, Mallee and Nullarbor bioregions.

- Subspecies angustifolia grows in loam or sand with clay, in low woodland or open mallee in scattered locations within 100 km (62 mi) of the coast, between Jerramungup and far western South Australia, near Eucla.
- Subspecies incurva grows in loam over clay in Eucalyptus spathulata woodland or open mallee with E. transcontinentalis but is only known from the Ongerup–Pingrup area.
- Subspecies mutabilis grows in sand, sandy clay, clay, loam and sandy loam in heath, open scrub or tree mallee and as an understorey in open woodland, often near salt lakes or marshes from the Kondinin–Borden area to Cape Arid National Park in the south-west of Western Australia.
- Subspecies rhynchophylla grows in gravelly sand, sandy loam or loam with Eucalyptus redunca and E. transcontinentalis from the Nyabing–Pingrup area and south to Borden.
- Subspecies stipulifera grows in loamy sand and clay, usually near salt lakes in low Eucalyptus kondininensis and E. occidentalis woodland.

== Conservation status ==
Subspecies angustifolia and mutabilis are listed as 'Not threatened', but subsp. incurva is listed as 'Priority Two' by the Western Australian Government Department of Biodiversity, Conservation and Attractions, meaning that it is poorly known and from only one or a few locations, and subsp. rhynchophylla and stipulifera are listed as 'Priority Three', meaning that they are poorly known and known from only a few locations but are not under imminent threat.

== See also ==
- List of Acacia species
