= Eucalyptus cuspidata =

Conservation status
- Data Deficient (IUCN 3.1)

Scientific classification
- Kingdom: Plantae
- Clade: Tracheophytes
- Clade: Angiosperms
- Clade: Eudicots
- Clade: Rosids
- Order: Myrtales
- Family: Myrtaceae
- Genus: Eucalyptus
- Species: E. cuspidata

Binomial name
- Eucalyptus cuspidata Turcz.

Species of eucalyptus

Eucalyptus cuspidata is a species of small, spreading mallee that is native to the south-west of Western Australia.

It was first formally described in 1849 by Nikolai Turczaninow in the journal, Bulletin de la Société Impériale des Naturalistes de Moscou. In 1867, George Bentham listed it in Flora Australiensis as a synonym of Eucalyptus incrassata var. angulosa occurring in Western Australia as did Joseph Maiden in A Critical Revision of the Genus Eucalyptus. In 1988, George Chippendale listed it in Flora of Australia as a synonym of Eucalyptus angulosa. Nevertheless, it is an accepted name by the Australian Plant Census.

It grows on plains and on the edges of seasonal swamps in the Esperance Plains biogeographic region.

== Conservation status ==
Eucalyptus cuspidata is classified as "not threatened" by the Western Australian Government Department of Parks and Wildlife.

== See also ==
- List of Eucalyptus species
