= Eucalyptus valens =

Conservation status
- Endangered (IUCN 3.1)

Scientific classification
- Kingdom: Plantae
- Clade: Tracheophytes
- Clade: Angiosperms
- Clade: Eudicots
- Clade: Rosids
- Order: Myrtales
- Family: Myrtaceae
- Genus: Eucalyptus
- Species: E. valens

Binomial name
- Eucalyptus valens L.A.S.Johnson & K.D.Hill

Species of eucalyptus

Eucalyptus valens is a species of mallet, a tree lacking a lignotuber, that is endemic to near-coastal areas of southern Western Australia. It has smooth bark, lance-shaped adult leaves, flower buds in groups of seven and cup-shaped fruit.

== Description ==
Eucalyptus valens is a mallet that typically grows to a height of 10 m (33 ft) but does not form a lignotuber. It has smooth white, pale grey or cream-coloured bark. Young plants have stems that are square in cross-section and leaves that are dull bluish green, egg-shaped to lance-shaped, 80–120 mm (3.1–4.7 in) long and 50–110 mm (2.0–4.3 in) wide. Adult leaves are glossy green, lance-shaped, 90–155 mm (3.5–6.1 in) long and 15–35 mm (0.59–1.38 in) wide tapering to a petiole 18–33 mm (0.71–1.30 in) long. The flower buds are arranged in leaf axils in groups of seven on a thick, unbranched peduncle 2–5 mm (0.079–0.197 in) long, the individual buds sessile or on pedicels up to 2 mm (0.079 in) long. Mature buds are oval, 9–13 mm (0.35–0.51 in) long and 6–8 mm (0.24–0.31 in) wide with a ribbed, conical or beaked operculum about equal in length to the operculum. The fruit is a sessile, cup-shaped capsule 6–11 mm (0.24–0.43 in) long and 8–11 mm (0.31–0.43 in) wide with the valves at rim level.

== Taxonomy and naming ==
Eucalyptus valens was first formally described in 2001 by Lawrie Johnson and Ken Hill in the journal Telopea from specimens collected by Ian Brooker near Lake King in 1977. The specific epithet (valens) is from a Latin word meaning to be vigorous or strong, referring to the habit of this species.

== Distribution and habitat ==
This mallet grows in woodland on the subcoastal plain from near Mount Ragged in the Cape Arid National Park to Scaddan and Salmon Gums.

== Conservation status ==
This eucalypt is classified as "not threatened" by the Western Australian Government Department of Parks and Wildlife. The IUCN Red List assesses the species as endangered.

== See also ==
- List of Eucalyptus species
