= Acacia luteola =

Scientific classification
- Kingdom: Plantae
- Clade: Tracheophytes
- Clade: Angiosperms
- Clade: Eudicots
- Clade: Rosids
- Order: Fabales
- Family: Fabaceae
- Subfamily: Caesalpinioideae
- Clade: Mimosoid clade
- Genus: Acacia
- Species: A. luteola

Binomial name
- Acacia luteola Maslin

Synonyms
- List: Acacia ciliata R.Br. nom. illeg. p.p.; Acacia ciliata R.Br. var. ciliata; Acacia drummondii var. ovoidea Benth.; Acacia obscura var. canescens Meisn.; Racosperma luteolum (Maslin) Pedley

Species of legume

Habit in Mount Lindesay National Park

Acacia luteola is a species of flowering plant in the family Fabaceae and is endemic to the southwest of Western Australia. It is a shrub with hairy branchlets, bipinnate leaves, spherical to cylindrical heads of cream-coloured to pale yellow flowers, and hairy pods.

== Description ==
Acacia luteola is a shrub that typically grows to a height of 20–70 cm (7.9–27.6 in) and has hairy branchlets. The leaves are bipinnate on a petiole 1–2 mm (0.039–0.079 in) long, the rachis 1.5–4 mm (0.059–0.157 in) long. The leaves have two or three pairs of pinnae, the lowest 2–5 mm (0.079–0.197 in) long with two or three pairs of pinnules, the end pinnae 3–12 mm (0.12–0.47 in) long with two to five pinnules. The pinnules are usually narrowly oblong, 2–6 mm (0.079–0.236 in) long and 0.5–1 mm (0.020–0.039 in) wide and curved down or rolled under. The flowers are borne in a spherical to cylindrical head in axils on hairy peduncles 10–20 mm (0.39–0.79 in) long, each head with 16 to 30 cream-coloured to pale yellow flowers. Flowering occurs from late February to September, and the pods are hairy, 20–50 mm (0.79–1.97 in) long and 4–6 mm (0.16–0.24 in) wide, the seeds elliptic, about 3 mm (0.12 in) long.

== Taxonomy ==
Acacia luteola was first formally described in 1975 by Bruce Maslin in the journal Nuytsia from specimens collected by Charles Gardner in the Porongurup Range in 1922. The specific epithet (luteola) means 'pale yellow', referring to the colour of the flower heads.

== Distribution and habitat ==
This species of wattle occurs from the Mount Barker–Stirling Range area and south-east to Albany and Beaufort Inlet in the Avon Wheatbelt, Esperance Plains, Jarrah Forest and Warren bioregions of southwestern Western Australia. It grows in sandy to sandy clay and loamy soils in seasonal swamps in mallee or woodland communities.

== Conservation status ==
Acacia luteola is listed as 'Not threatened' by the Western Australian Government Department of Biodiversity, Conservation and Attractions.

== See also ==
- List of Acacia species
