= Eucalyptus × missilis =

Conservation status
- Priority Four — Rare Taxa (DEC)

Scientific classification
- Kingdom: Plantae
- Clade: Tracheophytes
- Clade: Angiosperms
- Clade: Eudicots
- Clade: Rosids
- Order: Myrtales
- Family: Myrtaceae
- Genus: Eucalyptus
- Species: E. × missilis

Binomial name
- Eucalyptus × missilis Brooker & Hopper

Species of eucalyptus

Eucalyptus × missilis, commonly known as bullet bush, is a species of mallee that is endemic to a small area on the south coast of Western Australia. It has smooth bark, egg-shaped to lance-shaped adult leaves, flower buds in groups of between seven and fifteen, pale yellow flowers and cup-shaped to cylindrical fruit. It is thought to be a hybrid between E. cornuta and E. angulosa that occur in the same area.

== Description ==
Eucalyptus × missilis is a mallee that typically grows to a height of 3 m (9.8 ft) and forms a lignotuber. It has smooth dull grey bark. Adult leaves are egg-shaped to lance-shaped, the same shade of glossy green on both sides, 60–125 mm (2.4–4.9 in) long and 10–35 mm (0.39–1.38 in) wide on a petiole 8–25 mm (0.31–0.98 in) long. The flower buds are arranged in leaf axils in groups of between seven and fifteen on a thick, unbranched peduncle 12–35 mm (0.47–1.38 in) long, the individual buds sessile or on pedicels up to 3 mm (0.12 in) long. Mature buds are spindle-shaped, 17–23 mm (0.67–0.91 in) long and 7–8 mm (0.28–0.31 in) wide with a blunt, conical operculum. The flowers are pale yellow and the fruit is a woody, cylindrical to cup-shaped capsule, 10–15 mm (0.39–0.59 in) long and 8–15 mm (0.31–0.59 in) wide with the valves at rim level. The characteristics of this mallee are intermediate between those of E. cornuta and E. angulosa but the authors, Ian Brooker and Stephen Hopper consider "that the morphological uniformity of mature individuals within and between all populations justifies taxonomic recognition of the species." It is usually found growing with both parent species.

== Taxonomy and naming ==
Eucalyptus × missilis was first formally described in 2002 by Ian Brooker and Stephen Hopper in the journal Nuytsia from specimens collected from Cheyne Beach in 1983. The specific epithet (missilis) is a Latin word meaning "missile". The species is known as "bullet bush" because of the shaped of the flower buds.

== Distribution and habitat ==
This mallee grows in sand over limestone or granite in coastal sites between West Cape Howe and Cape Le Grand.

== Conservation status ==
This eucalypt is classified as "Priority Four" by the Government of Western Australia Department of Parks and Wildlife, meaning that is rare or near threatened.

== See also ==
- List of Eucalyptus species
