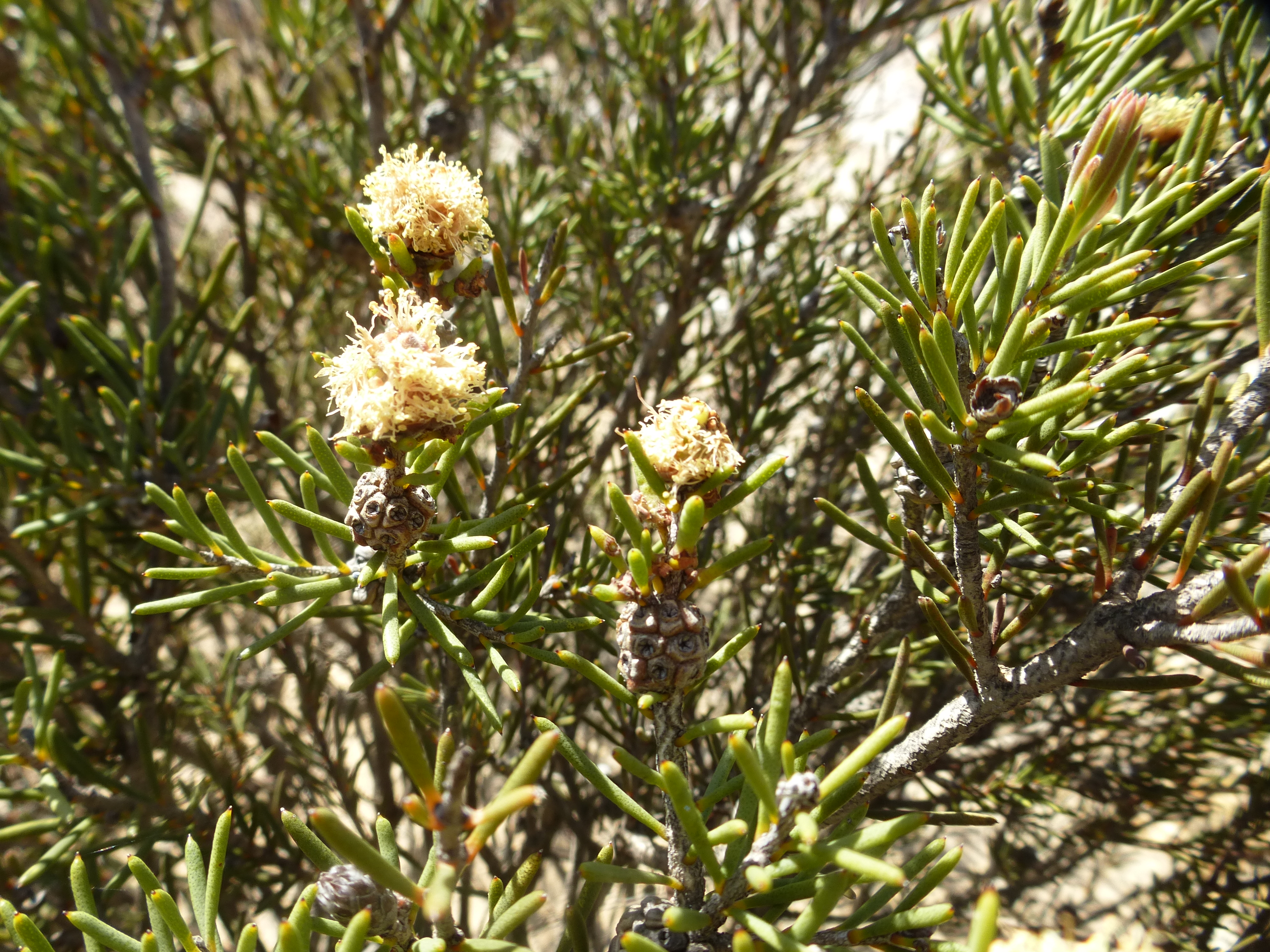

Scientific classification
- Kingdom: Plantae
- Clade: Tracheophytes
- Clade: Angiosperms
- Clade: Eudicots
- Clade: Rosids
- Order: Myrtales
- Family: Myrtaceae
- Genus: Melaleuca
- Species: M. condylosa

Binomial name
- Melaleuca condylosa Craven

= Melaleuca condylosa =

Species of flowering plant

Melaleuca condylosa is a plant in the myrtle family, Myrtaceae and is endemic to the south-west of Western Australia. It is similar to Melaleuca brophyi except that its fruiting clusters are often knobbly and the flower heads and leaves are slightly larger.

== Description ==
Melaleuca condylosa is a shrub growing to a height of about 3 m (10 ft) with papery bark. Its leaves are alternately arranged, 9.5–32 mm (0.4–1 in) long and 1.3–2.1 mm (0.05–0.08 in) wide, more or less linear in shape, almost circular in cross-section and have a pointed, although not sharp end.

The flowers are in heads at the ends of branches which continue to grow after flowering. Each head is composed of 6 to 11 groups of flowers with three flowers in each group. The petals are 1.2–2.0 mm (0.05–0.08 in) long and fall off as the flower opens. There are five bundles of stamens around the flower, each with 5 to 7 pale yellow stamens giving the flower its colour. Flowering occurs mainly in October and November and is followed by almost spherical, knobbly clusters of woody capsules, each 2.0–2.5 mm (0.08–0.1 in) long.

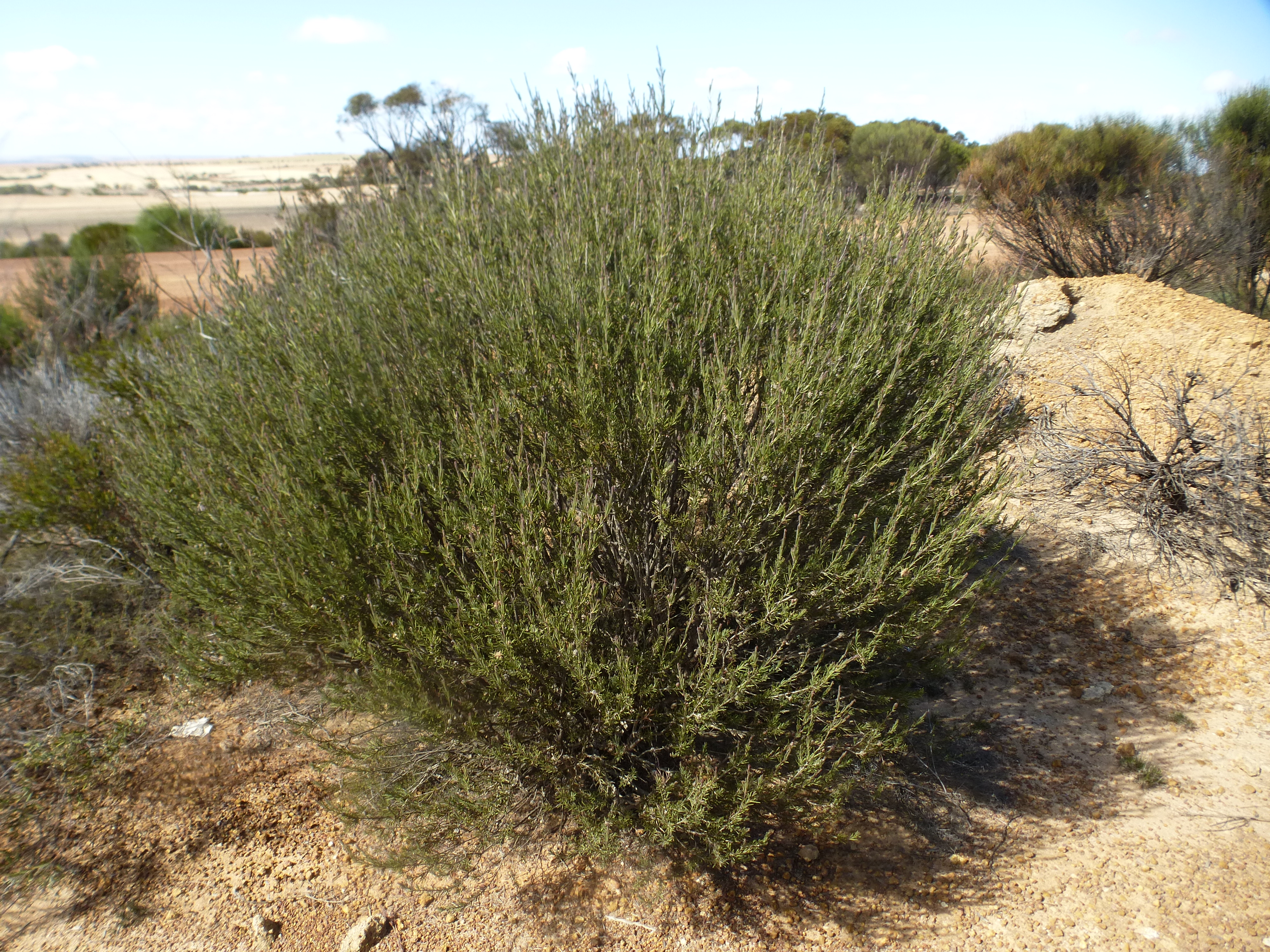
Habit at the type location near Bendering

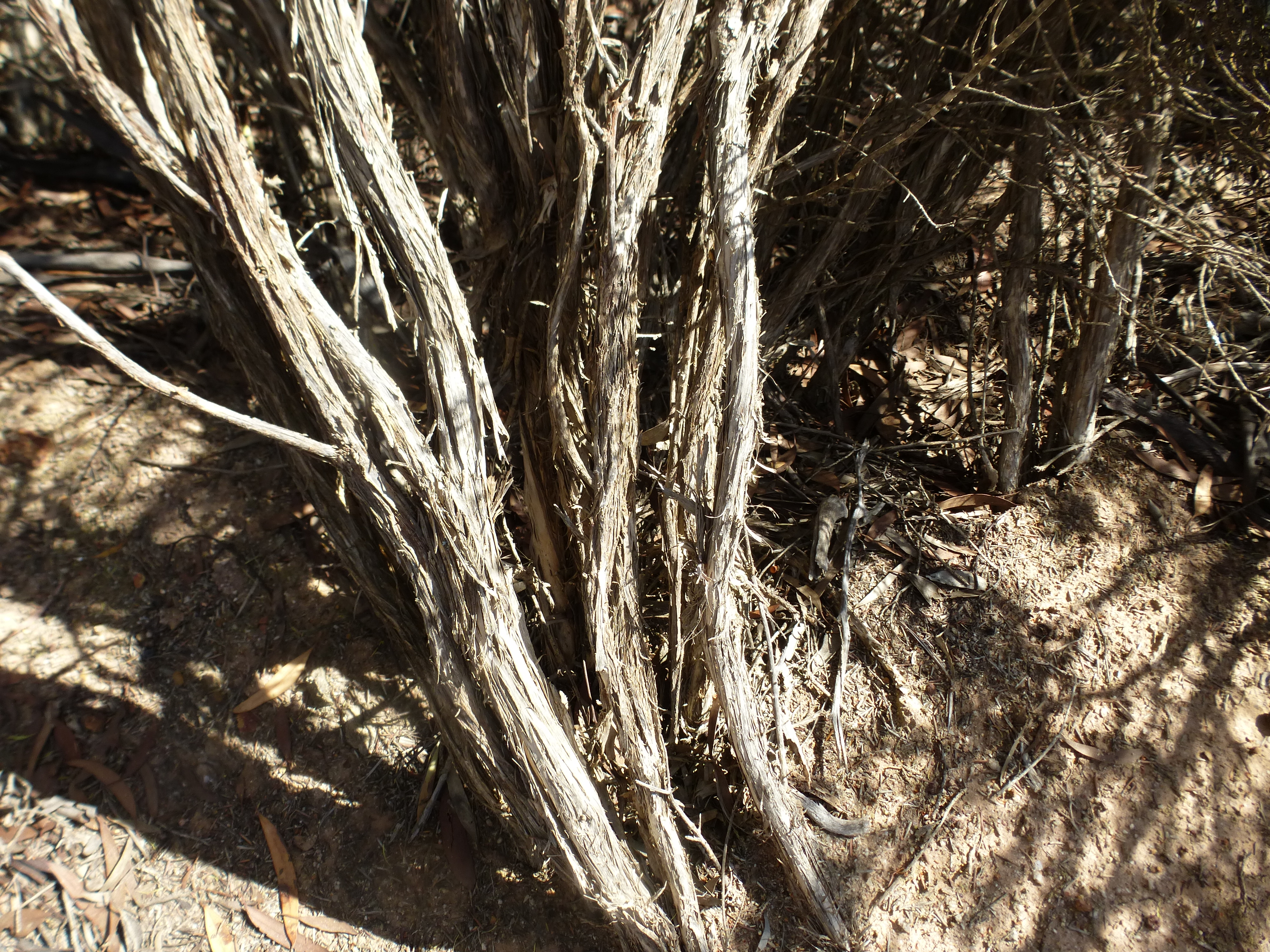
Bark

== Taxonomy and naming ==
Melaleuca condylosa was first formally described in 1999 by Lyndley Craven from a specimen found "40.5 kilometres (30 mi) east along Bendering Reserve Road from the Bendering wheat bin". The specific epithet (condylosa) is from the Greek kondylos meaning "knob" or "prominence", referring to the knobbly fruit.

== Distribution and habitat ==
This melaleuca occurs in the Narembeen, Kondinin and Hyden districts in the Avon Wheatbelt, Coolgardie and Mallee biogeographic regions. It grows in melaleuca-mallee shrubland in sandy loam on undulating sandplains and slopes.

== Conservation status ==
Melaleuca condylosa is listed as not threatened by the Government of Western Australia Department of Parks and Wildlife.
