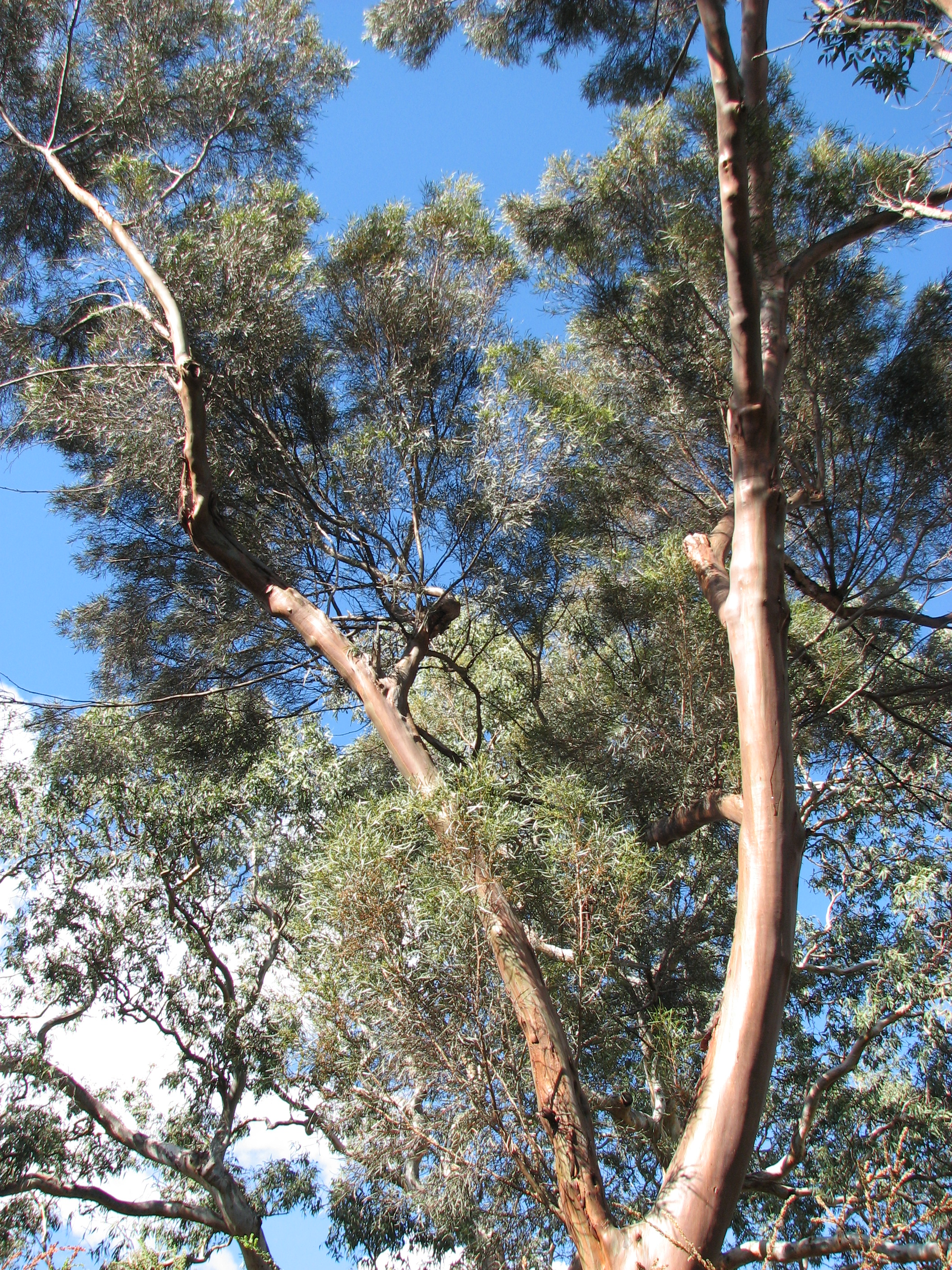

Conservation status
- Least Concern (IUCN 3.1)

Scientific classification
- Kingdom: Plantae
- Clade: Tracheophytes
- Clade: Angiosperms
- Clade: Eudicots
- Clade: Rosids
- Order: Myrtales
- Family: Myrtaceae
- Genus: Eucalyptus
- Species: E. spathulata

Binomial name
- Eucalyptus spathulata Hook.

Synonyms
- Eucalyptus occidentalis var. spathulata (Hook.) Maiden

= Eucalyptus spathulata =

Swamp mallet

Species of eucalyptus

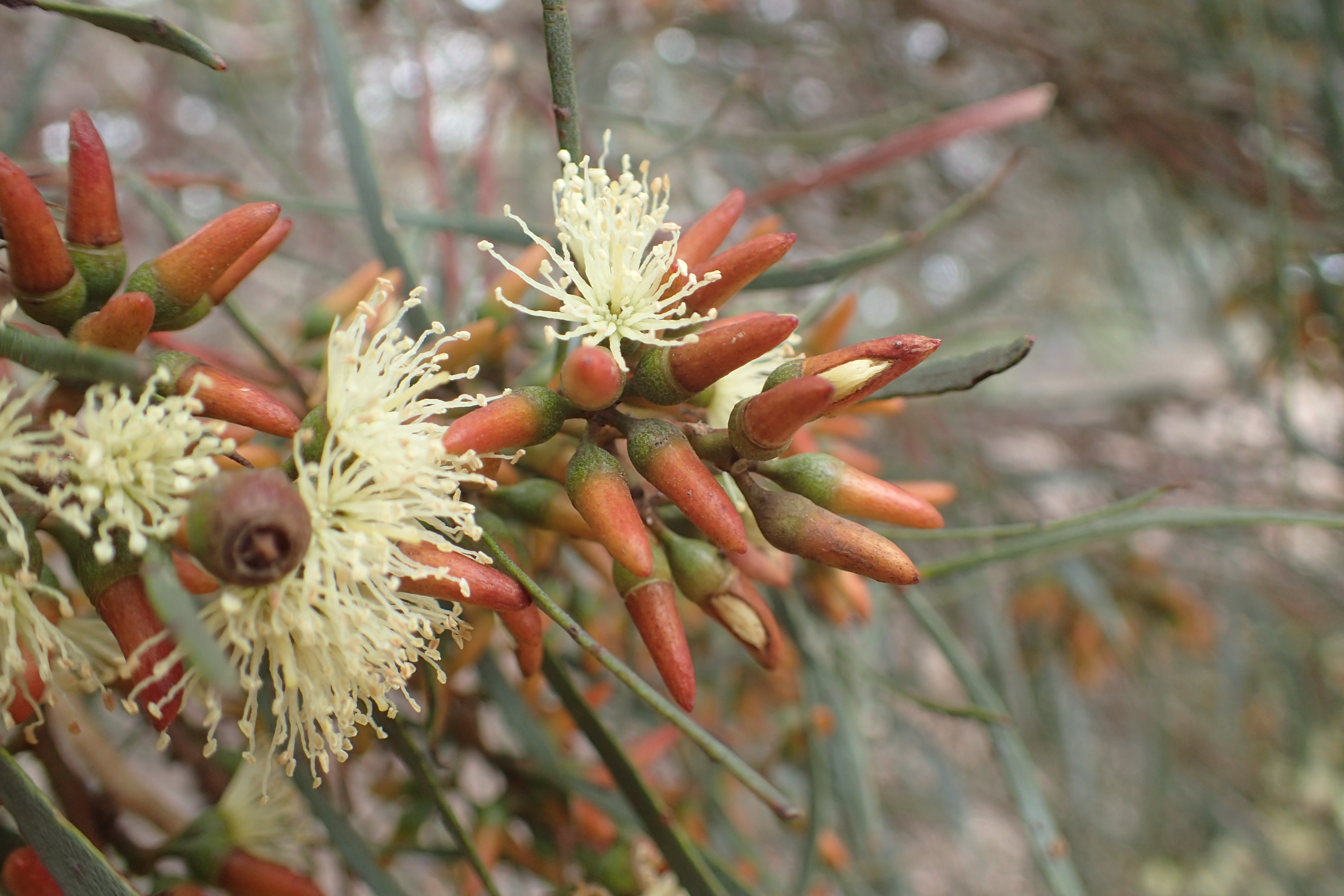
Flower buds and flowers

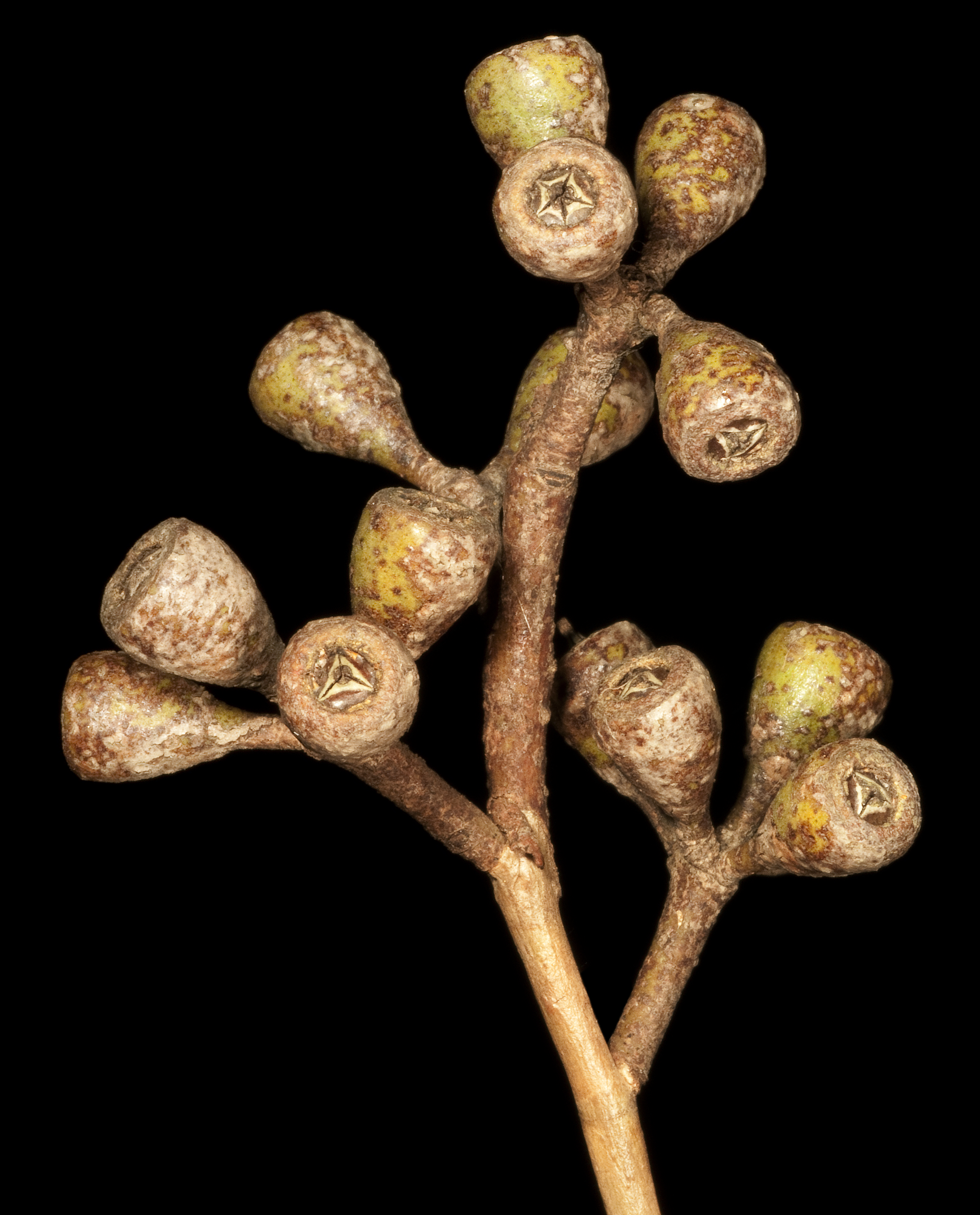
Capsules

Eucalyptus spathulata, commonly known as swamp mallet, narrow leaved gimlet or swamp gimlet, is a species of mallet that is endemic to Western Australia. It has a dense crown, smooth, satin-like bark, glossy green, linear leaves, flower buds in groups of three or seven, white flowers and cup-shaped to conical fruit.

== Description ==
Eucalyptus spathulata is a low-branching mallet with a dense crown that typically grows to a height of 8–12 m (26–39 ft) but does not form a lignotuber. The trunk usually has a diameter of 1–2 m (3 ft 3 in – 6 ft 7 in) but can be even larger for older trees, and it is usually relatively short, sometimes fluted at the base. The bark is smooth, satin-like, greyish brown or reddish brown on the trunk and branches. Young plants have linear leaves that are 35–50 mm (1.4–2.0 in) long and 3–5 mm (0.12–0.20 in) wide and sessile or have a short petiole. Adult leaves are linear, the same shade of glossy green on both sides, 35–95 mm (1.4–3.7 in) long and 2–6 mm (0.079–0.236 in) wide, tapering to a petiole 1–7 mm (0.039–0.276 in) long. The flowers are arranged in leaf axils in groups of three or seven on an unbranched peduncle 3–15 mm (0.12–0.59 in) long, the individual buds on pedicels 2–6 mm (0.079–0.236 in) long. Mature buds are oval to spindle-shaped, 10–13 mm (0.39–0.51 in) long and 3–5 mm (0.12–0.20 in) wide with a horn-shaped or conical operculum two or three times as long as the floral cup. Flowering occurs between December and March and the flowers are white. The fruit is a woody cup-shaped to conical capsule 3–8 mm (0.12–0.31 in) long and 4–7 mm (0.16–0.28 in) wide with the valves near rim level.

== Taxonomy and naming ==
Eucalyptus spathulata was formally described in 1844 by botanist William Jackson Hooker in his book Icones Plantarum, from specimens collected near the Swan River by James Drummond. The specific epithet (spathulata) is from the Latin word spathulatus, meaning spoon-like or a broad rounded upper part tapering gradually downward into a stalk. Why the name was chosen is unknown.

Two subspecies are recognised by the Australian Plant Census:

- E. spathulata subsp. salina D.Nicolle & Brooker is distinguished from the autonym by its larger fruit (6–8 mm (0.24–0.31 in) x 6–6.5 mm (0.24–0.26 in));
- E. spathulata Hook. subsp. spathulata has smaller fruit than subspecies spathulata (4–7 mm (0.16–0.28 in) x 4–6 mm (0.16–0.24 in)).

== Distribution and habitat ==
Swamp mallet is found on flats, broad valley floors, on rises, in and around saline depressions and along the edges of salt lakes in the southern Wheatbelt and inland Great Southern regions of Western Australia where it grows in sandy or sandy-clay soils over granite. Subspecies spathulata is found in the Blackwood River and Pallinup River drainage systems. Subspecies salina is restricted to the more northerly Salt River catchment.

The species grows in woodland communities with an understorey that contains a variety of melaleuca species including M. acuminata, M. pauperiflora, M. lateriflora, M. brophyi and M. uncinata group. Other associated species include Bossiaea halophila, Gahnia ancistrophylla and Brachyscome lineariloba, all well suited to calcareous, saline low-lying areas.

== Conservation status ==
Subspecies spathulata is classified as "not threatened" in Western Australia by the Western Australian Government Department of Parks and Wildlife, but subspecies salina is listed as "Priority Three", meaning that it is poorly known and known from only a few locations but is not under imminent threat.

== Use in horticulture ==
Eucalyptus spathulata has a high to moderate growth rate and can live to over 15 years. It is widely cultivated in southern Australia and can be grown in saline and poorly drained situations. The tree's wood is dense, hard and pale brown in colour and can be used as a source of fuelwood and craftwood. It is planted in gardens as an ornamental and as a windbreak, and produces pollen desirable for apiculture. The bark is rich in tannin and the leaves contain cineole. The tree is both drought and frost tolerant and can withstand salt laden winds. The tree has also been cultivated in California.

== See also ==
- List of Eucalyptus species
