= Eucalyptus tenuis =

Scientific classification
- Kingdom: Plantae
- Clade: Tracheophytes
- Clade: Angiosperms
- Clade: Eudicots
- Clade: Rosids
- Order: Myrtales
- Family: Myrtaceae
- Genus: Eucalyptus
- Species: E. tenuis

Binomial name
- Eucalyptus tenuis Brooker & Hopper

Species of eucalyptus

Eucalyptus tenuis is a species of slender mallet that is endemic to the southwest of Western Australia. It has smooth bark, lance-shaped adult leaves, flower buds in groups of three, creamy white flowers and conical, cup-shaped or bell-shaped fruit.

== Description ==
Eucalyptus tenuis is a slender mallet that typically grows to a height of 10 m (33 ft) and does not form a lignotuber. It has smooth pale grey to brownish bark that is shed in long ribbons. Young plants have bluish green leaves that are lance-shaped, 55–80 mm (2.2–3.1 in) long and 13–35 mm (0.51–1.38 in) wide. Adult leaves are the same shade of glossy green on both sides, lance-shaped, 60–1,100 mm (2.4–43.3 in) long and 7–15 mm (0.28–0.59 in) wide, tapering to a petiole 10–20 mm (0.39–0.79 in) long. The flower buds are arranged in leaf axils in groups of three on an unbranched peduncle 4–20 mm (0.16–0.79 in) long, the individual buds on pedicels 5–8 mm (0.20–0.31 in) long. Mature buds are pear-shaped to oval, 8–10 mm (0.31–0.39 in) long and 6–9 mm (0.24–0.35 in) wide with a rounded operculum. Flowering has been recorded in March and the flowers are creamy white. The fruit is a woody conical, cup-shaped or bell-shaped capsule 8–12 mm (0.31–0.47 in) long and 8–10 mm (0.31–0.39 in) wide with the valves near rim level.

== Taxonomy and naming ==
Eucalyptus tenuis was first formally described in 1993 by Ian Brooker and Stephen Hopper in the journal Nuytsia from specimens collected by Brooker near the Burra Rock Road south of Coolgardie in 1983. The specific epithet (tenuis) is a Latin word meaning "thin" or "slender", referring to the slender stems of this mallet.

== Distribution and habitat ==
This mallet occurs sporadically between Coolgardie, Norseman and Hyden, where it grows in red sandy-loam-clay soils.

== Conservation status ==
This eucalypt is classified as "not threatened" by the Western Australian Government Department of Parks and Wildlife.

== See also ==
- List of Eucalyptus species
