= Eucalyptus singularis =

Scientific classification
- Kingdom: Plantae
- Clade: Tracheophytes
- Clade: Angiosperms
- Clade: Eudicots
- Clade: Rosids
- Order: Myrtales
- Family: Myrtaceae
- Genus: Eucalyptus
- Species: E. singularis

Binomial name
- Eucalyptus singularis L.A.S.Johnson & Blaxell

Species of eucalyptus

Eucalyptus singularis, also known as ridge-top mallet, is a species of mallet that is endemic to Western Australia. It has smooth bark, sometimes with ribbons of rough bark at the base, lance-shaped adult leaves, flower buds usually in groups of seven, pale yellow flowers and cylindrical to barrel-shaped fruit.

== Description ==
Eucalyptus singularis is a mallet that typically grows to a height of 6 m (20 ft) but does not form a lignotuber. It has smooth greyish bark, sometimes with ribbons of rough grey to brown bark at the base. Young plants have dull, bluish green leaves that are elliptic to egg-shaped, 40–100 mm (1.6–3.9 in) long and 20–50 mm (0.79–1.97 in) wide. Adult leaves are the same shade of glossy green on both sides, lance-shaped to narrow lance-shaped, 55–130 mm (2.2–5.1 in) long and 6–20 mm (0.24–0.79 in) wide, tapering to a petiole 8–20 mm (0.31–0.79 in) long. The flower buds are usually arranged in groups of seven in leaf axils on a thin, unbranched peduncle 15–30 mm (0.59–1.18 in) long, the individual buds on pedicels 5–10 mm (0.20–0.39 in) long. Mature buds are more or less cylindrical, 15–25 mm (0.59–0.98 in) long and 5–6 mm (0.20–0.24 in) wide with a beaked operculum. Flowering occurs in November and December and the flowers are pale yellow. The fruit is a woody cylindrical to barrel-shaped capsule 10–15 mm (0.39–0.59 in) long and 8–14 mm (0.31–0.55 in) wide with the valves near rim level.

== Taxonomy and naming ==
Eucalyptus singularis was first formally described in 2001 by Lawrie Johnson and Donald Blaxell from a specimen collected north of Ravensthorpe by Barbara Briggs and Johnson in 1984. The specific epithet (singularis) is a Latin word meaning "along" or "solitary", referring to the habit of this species compared to others in the E. incrassata group.

== Distribution and habitat ==
This mallet grows in shallow sand over laterite north-west of Ravensthorpe towards Lake Magenta, Dragon Rocks and Dumbleyung in the Esperance Plains and Mallee biogeographic regions.

== Conservation status ==
This eucalypt is classified as "not threatened" by the Western Australian Government Department of Parks and Wildlife.

== See also ==
- List of Eucalyptus species
