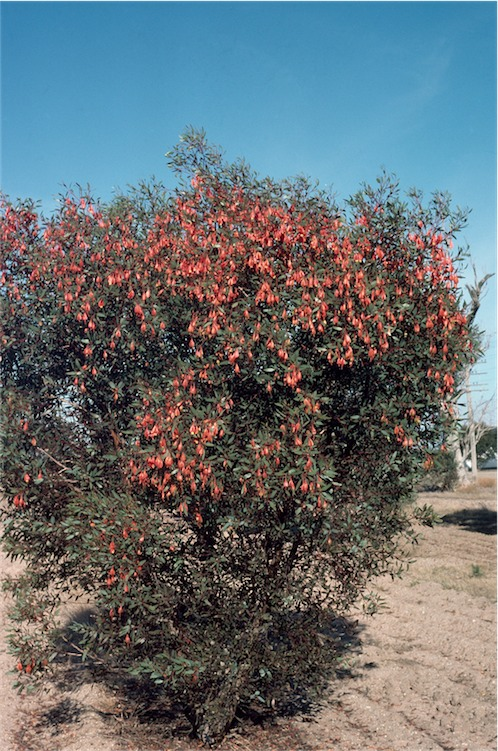
- Eucalyptus dolichorhyncha (cultivated specimen)

Conservation status
- Endangered (IUCN 3.1)

- Priority Four — Rare Taxa (DEC)

Scientific classification
- Kingdom: Plantae
- Clade: Tracheophytes
- Clade: Angiosperms
- Clade: Eudicots
- Clade: Rosids
- Order: Myrtales
- Family: Myrtaceae
- Genus: Eucalyptus
- Species: E. dolichorhyncha

Binomial name
- Eucalyptus dolichorhyncha (Brooker) Brooker & Hopper

Synonyms
- Eucalyptus forrestiana subsp. dolichorhyncha Brooker

= Eucalyptus dolichorhyncha =

Fuchsia gum

Species of eucalyptus

Eucalyptus dolichorhyncha, commonly known as the fuchsia gum or fuchsia mallee, is a species of mallet that is endemic to the south-west of Western Australia. It has smooth, pale grey over pale brown bark, lance-shaped to oblong adult leaves, pendulous, solitary, red flower buds in leaf axils, yellow flowers and winged fruit that is square in cross-section.

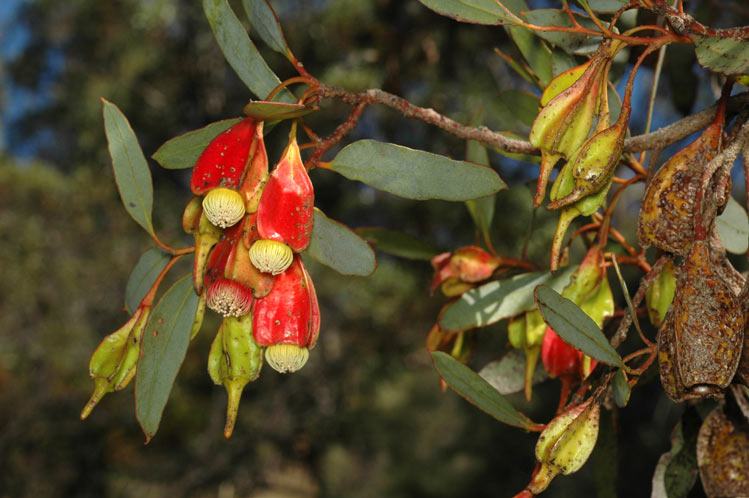
Flower buds and fruit

== Description ==
Eucalyptus dolichorhyncha is a mallet that typically grows to a height of 1–6 m (3 ft 3 in – 19 ft 8 in) but does not form a lignotuber. It has smooth, pale grey over pale orange to pale brown bark. Young plants and coppice regrowth have leaves arranged alternately and egg-shaped to lance-shaped, 30–100 mm (1.2–3.9 in) long and 20–60 mm (0.79–2.36 in) wide and petiolate. Adult leaves are lance-shaped to oblong, 45–90 mm (1.8–3.5 in) long and 10–27 mm (0.39–1.06 in) wide on a petiole 8–16 mm (0.31–0.63 in) wide. The flower buds hang singly in leaf axils on a peduncle 20–42 mm (0.79–1.65 in) long, the pedicel 8–15 mm (0.31–0.59 in) long. Mature buds are red, oblong and square in cross section with a wing on each corner, 32–55 mm (1.3–2.2 in) long and 10–18 mm (0.39–0.71 in) wide. Flowering occurs between January and May and the flowers are yellow. The fruit is a woody capsule that is a similar shape to the mature buds, 29–40 mm (1.1–1.6 in) long and 13–30 mm (0.51–1.18 in) wide with the valves enclosed below the rim.

== Taxonomy and naming ==
Fuchsia gum was first formally described in 1973 by Ian Brooker who gave it the name Eucalyptus forrestiana subsp. dolichorhyncha and published the description in the Journal of the Royal Society of Western Australia. The type specimen was collected by John W. Green near Grass Patch in 1957. In 1993, Brooker and Hopper raised the subspecies to species status as E. dolichorhyncha. The specific epithet (dolichorhyncha) is derived from the Ancient Greek words dolichos meaning "long" and rhynchos meaning "snout" or "muzzle", referring to the long narrow operculum.

== Distribution and habitat ==
Eucalyptus dolichorhyncha has a limited range on flats in a small area along the south coast of the Goldfields-Esperance region of Western Australia north of Esperance where it grows in sandy clay or clay soils.

== Conservation status ==
This mallet is classified as "Priority Four" by the Government of Western Australia Department of Parks and Wildlife, meaning that is rare or near threatened.

== See also ==
- List of Eucalyptus species
