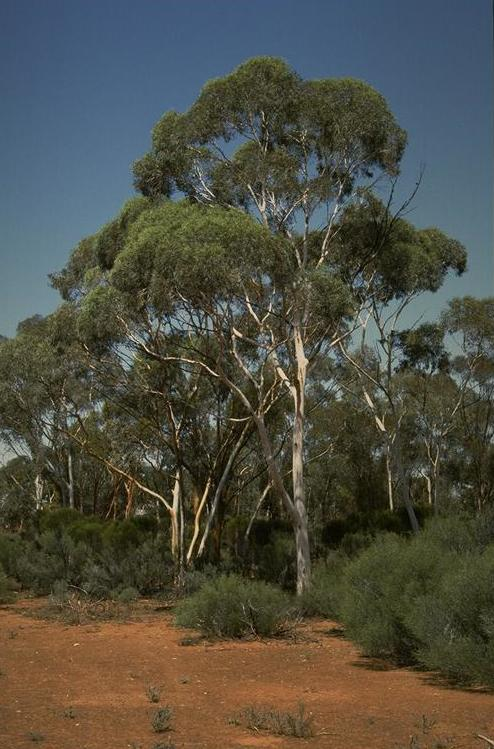
- Eucalyptus transcontinentalis near Kalgoorlie

Scientific classification
- Kingdom: Plantae
- Clade: Embryophytes
- Clade: Tracheophytes
- Clade: Spermatophytes
- Clade: Angiosperms
- Clade: Eudicots
- Clade: Rosids
- Order: Myrtales
- Family: Myrtaceae
- Genus: Eucalyptus
- Species: E. transcontinentalis

Binomial name
- Eucalyptus transcontinentalis Maiden

Synonyms
- Eucalyptus oleosa var. glauca Maiden; Eucalyptus transcontinentalis Maiden subsp. transcontinentalis; Eucalyptus uncinata var. rostrata Benth.

= Eucalyptus transcontinentalis =

Redwood

Species of eucalyptus

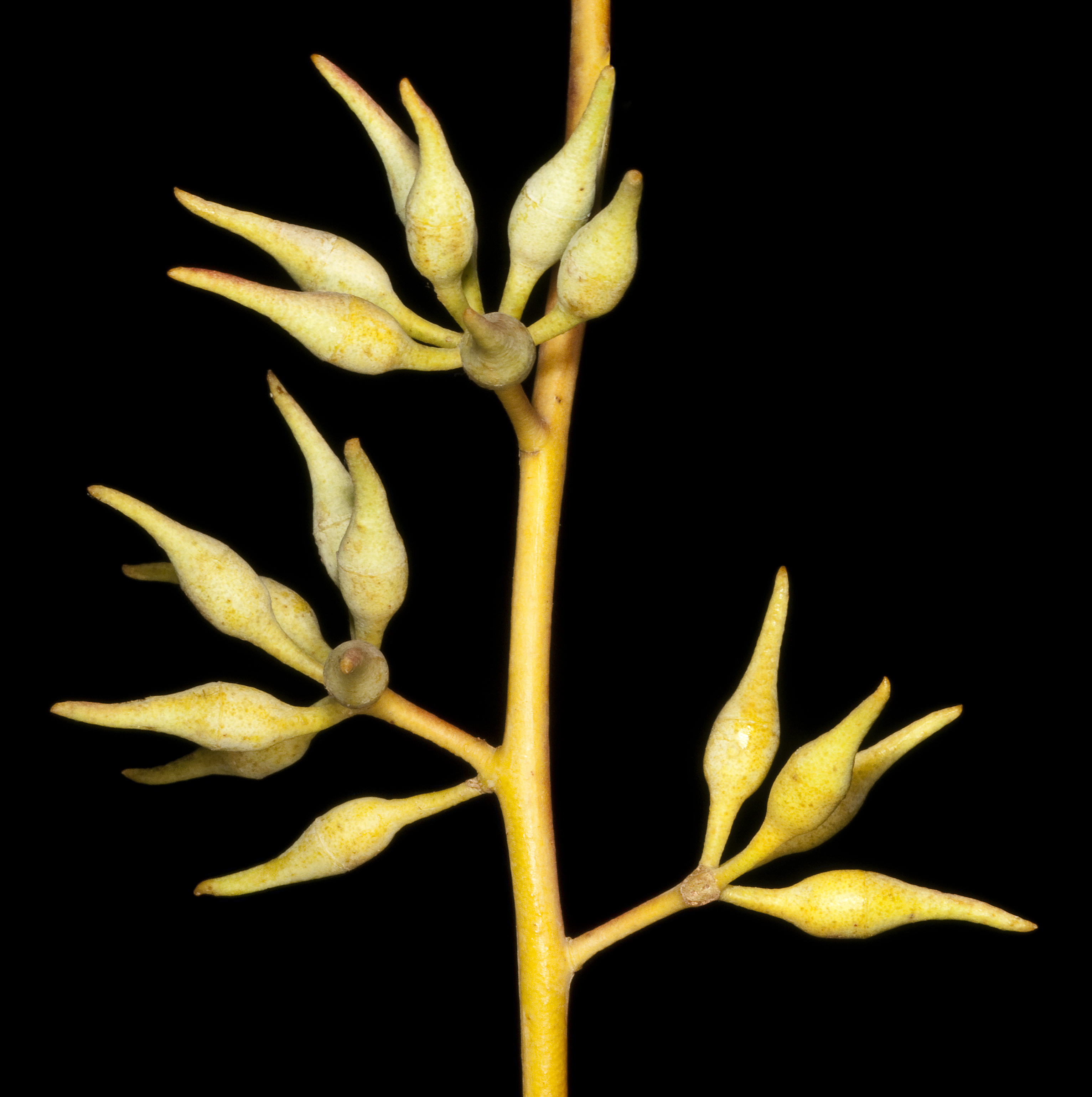
Flower buds

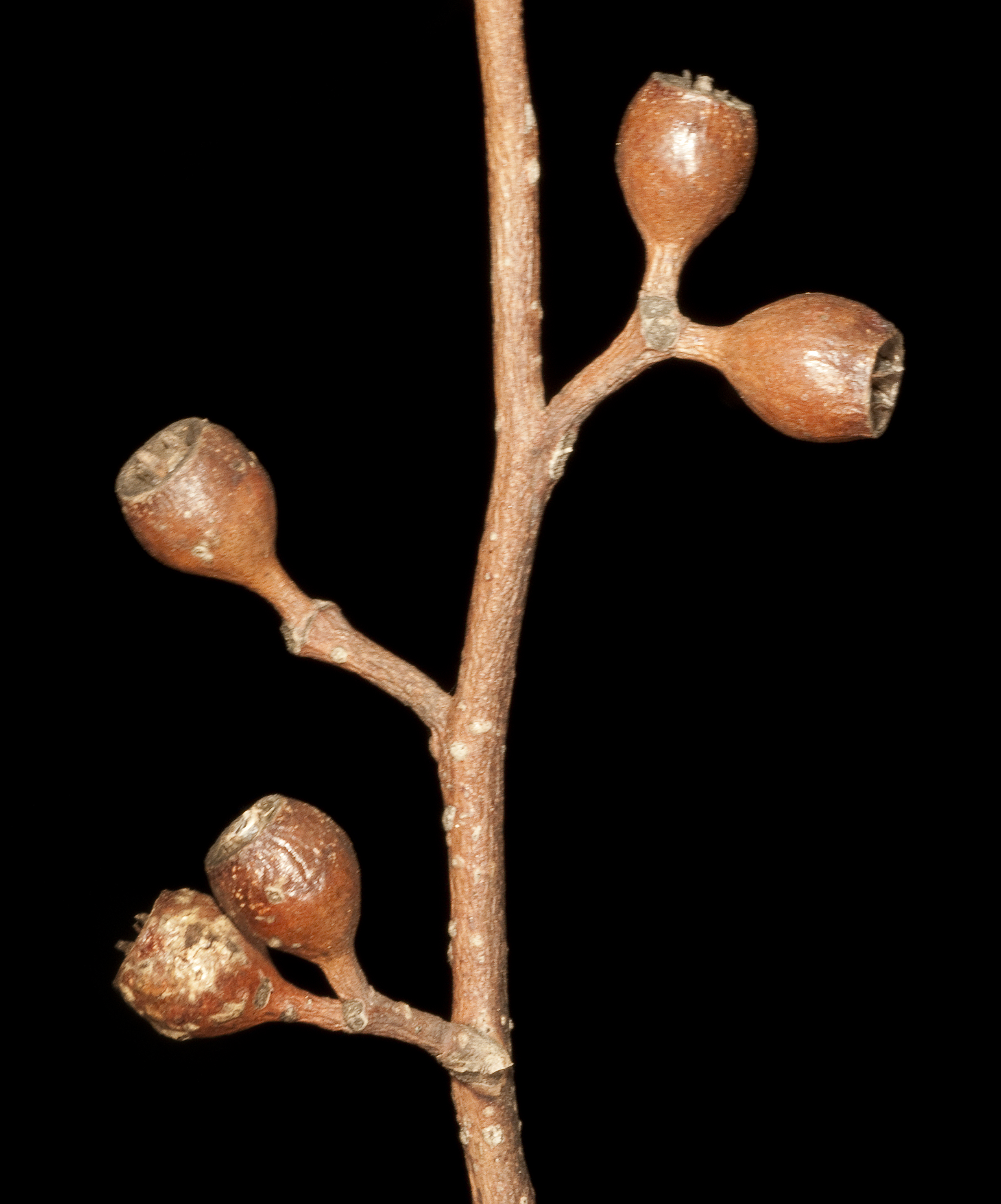
Fruiting capsules

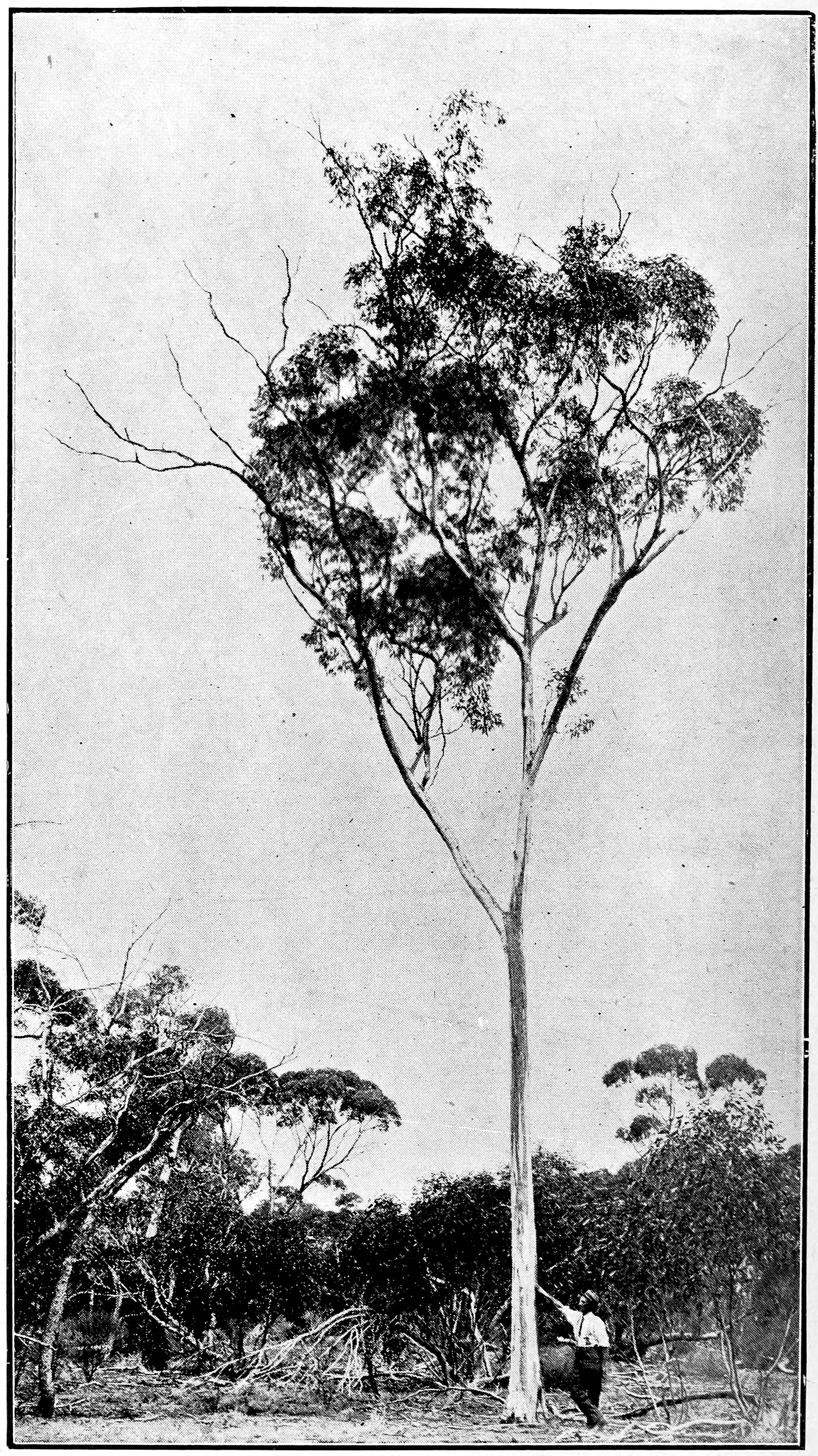
Mature tree with man standing at right, circa 1920

Eucalyptus transcontinentalis, commonly known as redwood or boongul, is a species of small to medium-sized tree, sometimes a mallet, that is endemic to the southwest of Western Australia. It has smooth bark, lance-shaped adult leaves, flower buds usually in groups of seven, pale yellow flowers and urn-shaped to barrel-shaped fruit.

== Description ==
Eucalyptus transcontinentalis is a tree, sometimes a mallet, that typically grows to a height of 12–25 m (39–82 ft) but does not form a lignotuber. It has smooth white or greyish bark with occasional pale grey-yellow or pink blotches. Young plants and coppice regrowth have stems that are square in cross-section with a prominent wing on each corner and sessile dull greyish to glaucous, egg-shaped leaves that are 35–55 mm (1.4–2.2 in) long and 13–25 mm (0.51–0.98 in) wide. Adult leaves are arranged alternately, the same shade of dull bluish green on both sides, lance-shaped, 50–150 mm (2.0–5.9 in) long and 8–20 mm (0.31–0.79 in) wide, tapering to a petiole 8–22 mm (0.31–0.87 in) long. The flower buds are arranged in leaf axils usually in groups of seven on an ubranched peduncle 5–15 mm (0.20–0.59 in) long, the individual buds on pedicels 4–7 mm (0.16–0.28 in) long. Mature buds are oval to oblong, 13–22 mm (0.51–0.87 in) long and 4–6 mm (0.16–0.24 in) wide with a beaked to horn-shaped operculum 8–15 mm (0.31–0.59 in) long. Flowering occurs between July and December and the flowers are pale yellow. The fruit is a woody, urn-shaped to barrel-shaped capsule 6–10 mm (0.24–0.39 in) long, 5–9 mm (0.20–0.35 in) wide and glaucous, with the valves protruding prominently.

== Taxonomy and naming ==
Eucalyptus transcontinentalis was first formally described in 1919 by Joseph Maiden in the Journal and Proceedings of the Royal Society of New South Wales from specimens he had collected from near Kalgoorlie in 1909.

Maiden considered that Eucalyptus oleosa var. glauca Maiden and Eucalyptus uncinata var. rostrata Benth. are synonyms and that the range of E. transcontinentalis, extended into South Australia, Victoria and New South Wales.

The tree has been referred to as Goldfields Redwood, a reference to the mining operations in its habitat.

== Distribution and habitat ==
Redwood is found on flats and low rises on red sandy loam in open forest and woodland in the southern and central goldfields from the Frank Hann National Park near Salmon Gums, east to near Norseman and north to near Menzies.

== Conservation status ==
This eucalypt is classified as "not threatened" by the Western Australian Government Department of Parks and Wildlife.

== See also ==
- List of Eucalyptus species
