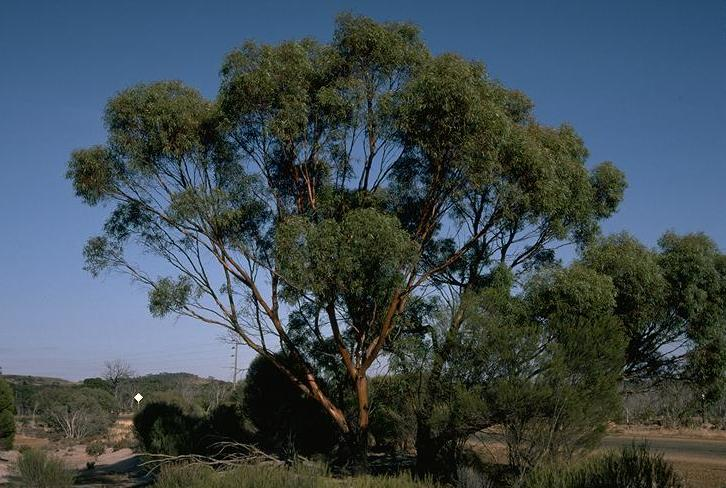
- Eucalyptus sargentii near Hyden

Conservation status
- Endangered (IUCN 3.1)

Scientific classification
- Kingdom: Plantae
- Clade: Tracheophytes
- Clade: Angiosperms
- Clade: Eudicots
- Clade: Rosids
- Order: Myrtales
- Family: Myrtaceae
- Genus: Eucalyptus
- Species: E. sargentii

Binomial name
- Eucalyptus sargentii Maiden

= Eucalyptus sargentii =

Salt River gum

Species of eucalyptus

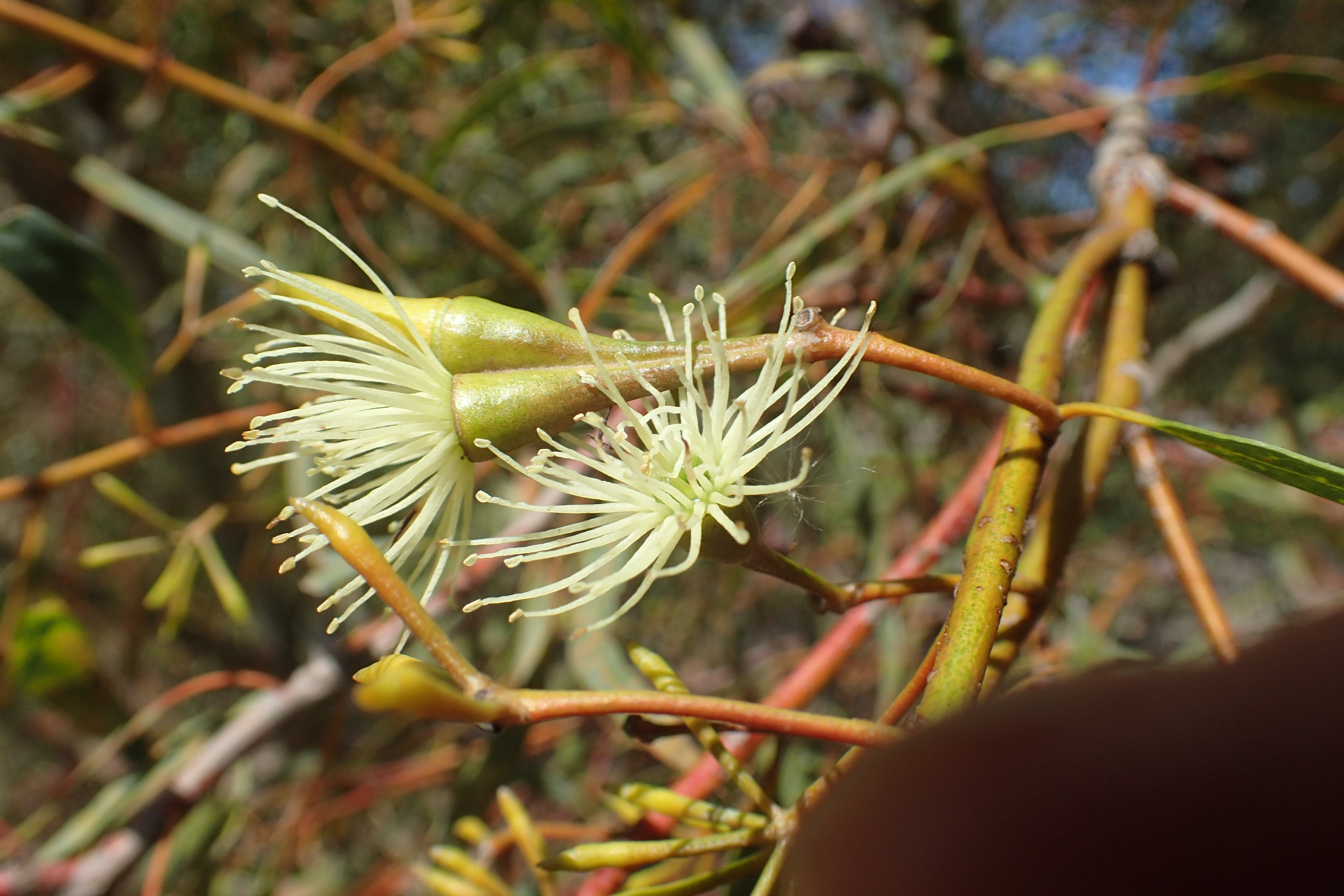
Flowers in Kings Park, Perth

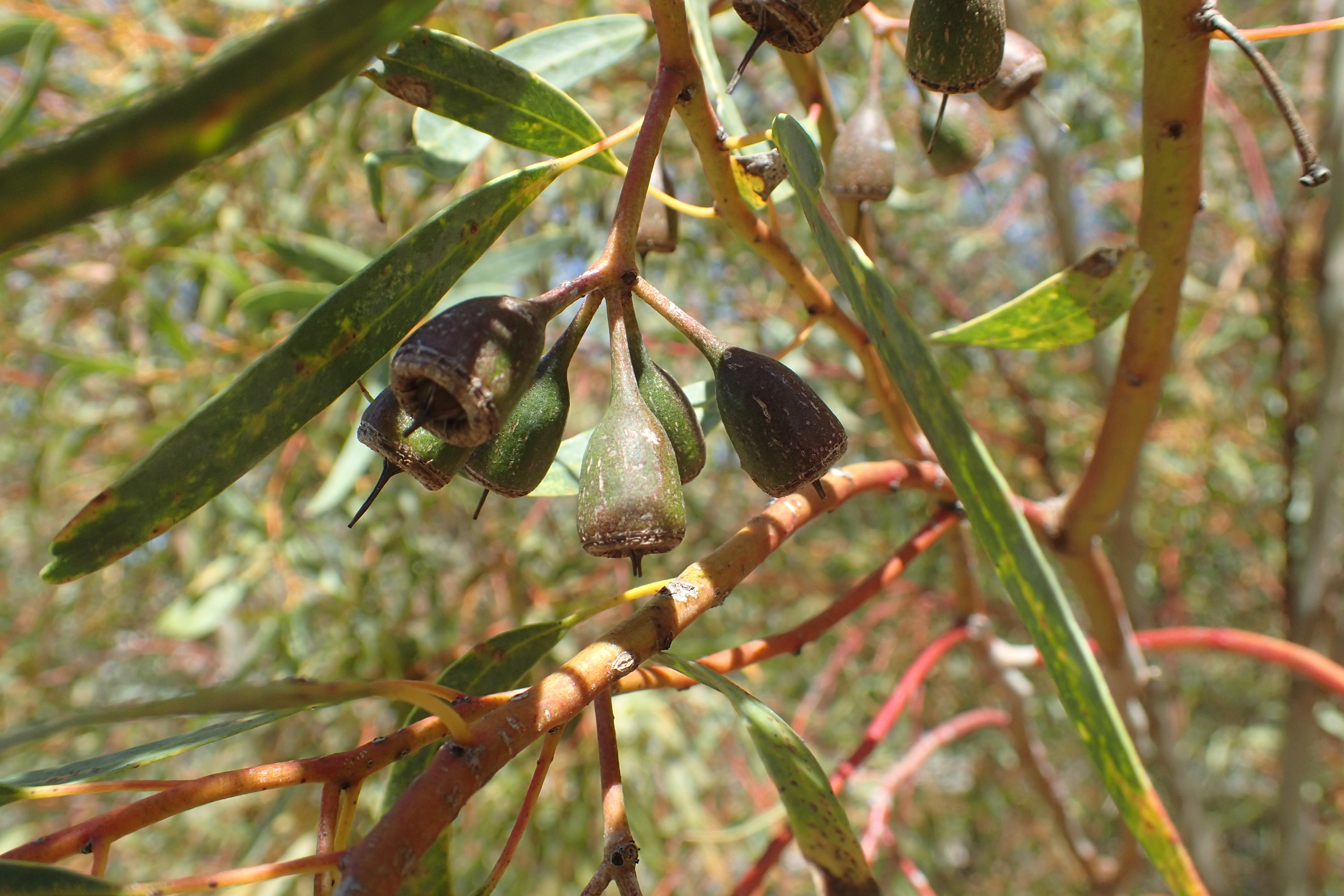
Fruit in Kings Park

Eucalyptus sargentii, commonly known as Salt River gum, is a species of mallet, mallee or small tree that is endemic to Western Australia. It has rough bark on part or all of the trunk, smooth bark above, linear to narrow lance-shaped leaves, flower buds in groups of seven, whitish to creamy yellow flowers and conical fruit.

== Description ==
Eucalyptus sargentii is a tree or a mallee that typically grows to a height of 3–12 m (9.8–39.4 ft) but does not usually form a lignotuber (a mallet). It has smooth greenish bark that is brownish when new, usually with rough, greyish flaky bark on part or all of the trunk. Adult leaves are arranged alternately, the same shade of green on both sides, linear to narrow lance-shaped or curved, 53–126 mm (2.1–5.0 in) long and 5–13 mm (0.20–0.51 in) wide tapering to a petiole 5–18 mm (0.20–0.71 in) long. The flower buds are arranged in leaf axils in groups of seven on an unbranched peduncle 7–20 mm (0.28–0.79 in) long, the individual buds on pedicels 3–6 mm (0.12–0.24 in) long. Mature buds are an elongated oval shape, 16–26 mm (0.63–1.02 in) long and 4–5 mm (0.16–0.20 in) wide with a horn-shaped operculum that is about twice as long as the floral cup. Flowering occurs from August or October to December or January and the flowers are whitish to creamy yellow. The fruit is a woody conical capsule 6–9 mm (0.24–0.35 in) long and 5–8 mm (0.20–0.31 in) wide with the valves near rim level.

== Taxonomy and naming ==
Eucalyptus sargentii was first formally described in 1924 by Joseph Maiden in his book A Critical Revision of the Genus Eucalyptus. The specific epithet honours Oswald Hewlett Sargent, a pharmacist and naturalist from York.

In 1992, Lawrie Johnson and Ken Hill described E. sargentii subsp. fallens and E. sargentii subsp. sargentii (the autonym, but of these subspecies, only the autonym is accepted by the Australian Plant Census (APC). In 2005, Dean Nicolle described E. sargentii subsp. onesis (originally as subsp. onesia) and the name is accepted by the APC. Subspecies onesis differs from the autonym in having a lignotuber and a dense, spreading mallee habit. The name onesis is from an ancient Greek word meaning "advantage" or "use", referring to the potential use of this subspecies in reclaiming saline sites.

== Distribution and habitat ==
Salt River gum grows in open woodland in low-lying, poorly drained areas near salt lakes and salt creeks. It has a scattered distribution from Pithara to Lake Grace in the Avon Wheatbelt biogeographic region. Subspecies onesis is restricted to seven populations between Piawaning, York and Cunderdin.

== Conservation status ==
Subspecies sargenti is classified as "not threatened" by the Western Australian Government Department of Parks and Wildlife, but subspecies onesis is classified as "Priority Three" by the Government of Western Australia Department of Parks and Wildlife meaning that it is poorly known and known from only a few locations but is not under imminent threat.

== See also ==
- List of Eucalyptus species
