= Pallinup River =

River in Western Australia

Coordinates: 34°27′42.69″S 118°51′10.24″E

Location
- Country: Australia

Physical characteristics
- Source
  - location: 10 km southeast of Broomehill
  - elevation: 323 metres (1,060 ft)
- Mouth
  - location: Beaufort Inlet
- Length: 250 km (160 mi)
- Basin size: 4,795 km^{2} (1,851 sq mi)
- Discharge
  - average: 24,800 ML/a (0.79 m^{3}/s; 27.8 cu ft/s)

The Pallinup River is a river in the Great Southern region of Western Australia. It was previously known as Salt River.

The Pallinup rises 10 km southeast of Broomehill, and flows in a southeasterly direction toward the coast passing through Kybelup Pool and discharging into the Southern Ocean via Beaufort Inlet.

The river is one of the longest rivers in the region and its tributaries flow through the towns of Borden and Gnowangerup.

The local Noongar people also know the river as the Mara River; it is regarded as a place of historical importance as the Noongar have camped, fished and traded along the banks of the river for generations.

The river is ephemeral and the estuary at Beaufort Inlet can be closed to the sea for long period of time by a sand bar in the channel.

The water in the river is considered to be saline with salinity levels varying from 3‰ when the river is flowing to over 50‰ in pools during summer.

== Tributaries ==
The Pallinup has many tributaries, including Warperup Creek, Six Mile Creek, Pendenup Creek, Peendebup Creek, Monjebup Creek and Corackerup Creek. No potable surface water sources are present in the Pallinup. The water quality ranges from brackish to saline. The best quality water streams exist in the Stirling Range National Park area of the catchment, which is the occasional source of snow-melt water.

== Condition ==
The Pallinup is showing signs of degradation. Increased salinity, loss of riparian vegetation, weed invasion, erosion and high nutrient levels are all problematic. Much of the river is fenced but sections were lost in the 1955 and 1982 flood events. It is estimated that 85% of the catchment area is cleared mostly in the upper reaches of the river.
