= Beaufort Inlet (Western Australia) =

Inlet on south coast of Western Australia

- Interactive map of Beaufort Inlet
- Coordinates: 34°27′31″S 118°53′23″E
- Country: Australia
- State: Western Australia
- LGA: Shire of Jerramungup

Beaufort Inlet also locally known as Pallinup Estuary is an inlet located in the Great Southern region of Western Australia about 130 kilometres (81 mi) east of Albany.

The inlet functions mostly as a result of wave energy and is a wave dominated estuary. The estuary is in a highly modified condition as a result of substantial clearing within the catchment and is eutrophied and prone to fish kills.

Covering a total area of 5.5 square kilometres (2 sq mi), with the central basin having an area of 4.2 square kilometres (2 sq mi) the inlet is fed with waters from the Pallinup River (Salt River). The inlet holds a volume of 6,500,000 cubic metres (229,545,334 cu ft) and is enclosed by a 500 metres (1,640 ft) long sandbar that opens periodically at intervals of several years.
