= Mallet (habit) =

A mallet is a small-tree form of Eucalyptus found in Western Australia. Unlike the mallee, it is single-stemmed and lacks a lignotuber. Species of this form have a relatively long, slender trunk, steeply-angled branches, often a conspicuously dense terminal crown, and sometimes form thickets.

Mallet species include:

- Brown mallet (Eucalyptus astringens)
- Blue mallet, blue-leaved mallet, Gardner's mallet (Eucalyptus gardneri)
- Green mallet (Eucalyptus clivicola)
- Salt River mallet, Sargent's mallet (Eucalyptus sargentii)
- Silver mallet (Eucalyptus falcata or Eucalyptus ornata)
- Steedman's mallet (Eucalyptus steedmanii)
- Swamp mallet (Eucalyptus spathulata)
- White mallet (Eucalyptus falcata or Eucalyptus spathulata)
- Fuchsia gum (Eucalyptus dolichorhyncha)

== See also ==
- Mallee
- Marlock
- Gimlet
