= Blue gum =

Blue gum is a common name for subspecies or the species in Eucalyptus globulus complex, and also a number of other species of Eucalyptus in Australia. In Queensland, it usually refers to Eucalyptus tereticornis, which is known elsewhere as forest red gum.

== Eucalyptus globulus ==
- Tasmanian blue gum: Eucalyptus globulus (syn. E. globulus subsp. globulus)
- Gippsland blue gum: Eucalyptus pseudoglobulus (syn. E. globulus subsp. pseudoglobulus)
- Spotted blue gum: Eucalyptus maidenii (syn. E. globulus subsp. maidenii)
- Southern blue gum: Eucalyptus bicostata (syn. Victorian blue gum or E. globulus subsp. bicostata)

== Other Eucalyptus species ==
- Inland blue gum: E. leucoxylon
- Large-fruited blue gum: E. leucoxylon
- Mountain blue gum: E. cypellocarpa, E. deanei
- Round-leaved blue gum: E. deanei
- South Australian blue gum: E. leucoxylon
- Sydney blue gum: E. saligna
- Other species, such as shining gum (E. nitens), and the Sydney blue gum (E. notabilis), are sometimes regarded as blue gums
- Historically, the Dictionary of Australian Words also mentions E. botryoides, E. diversicolor, E. goniocalyx and E. viminalis (the famous "manna gum") in its list of "blue gum" species.
