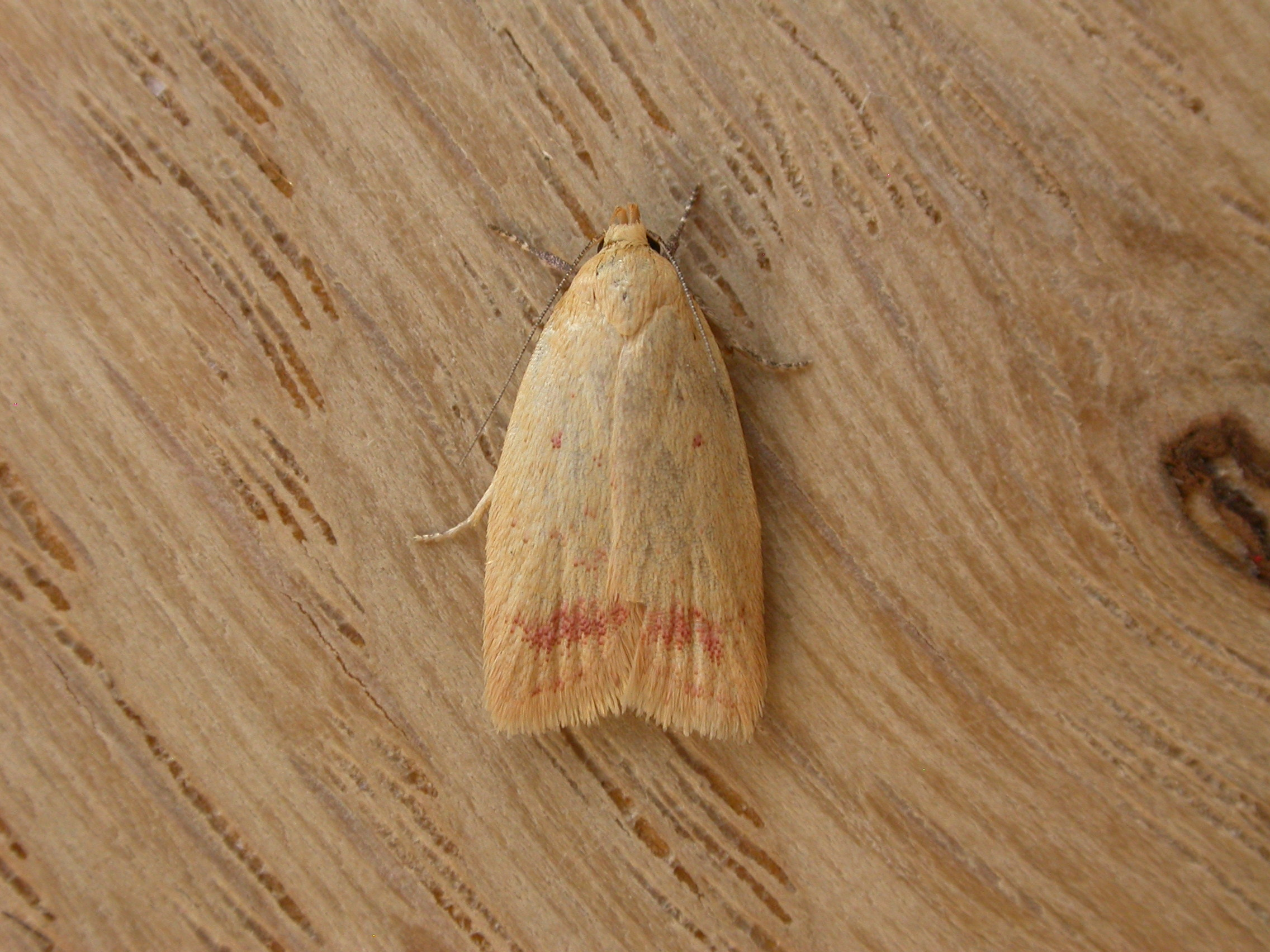

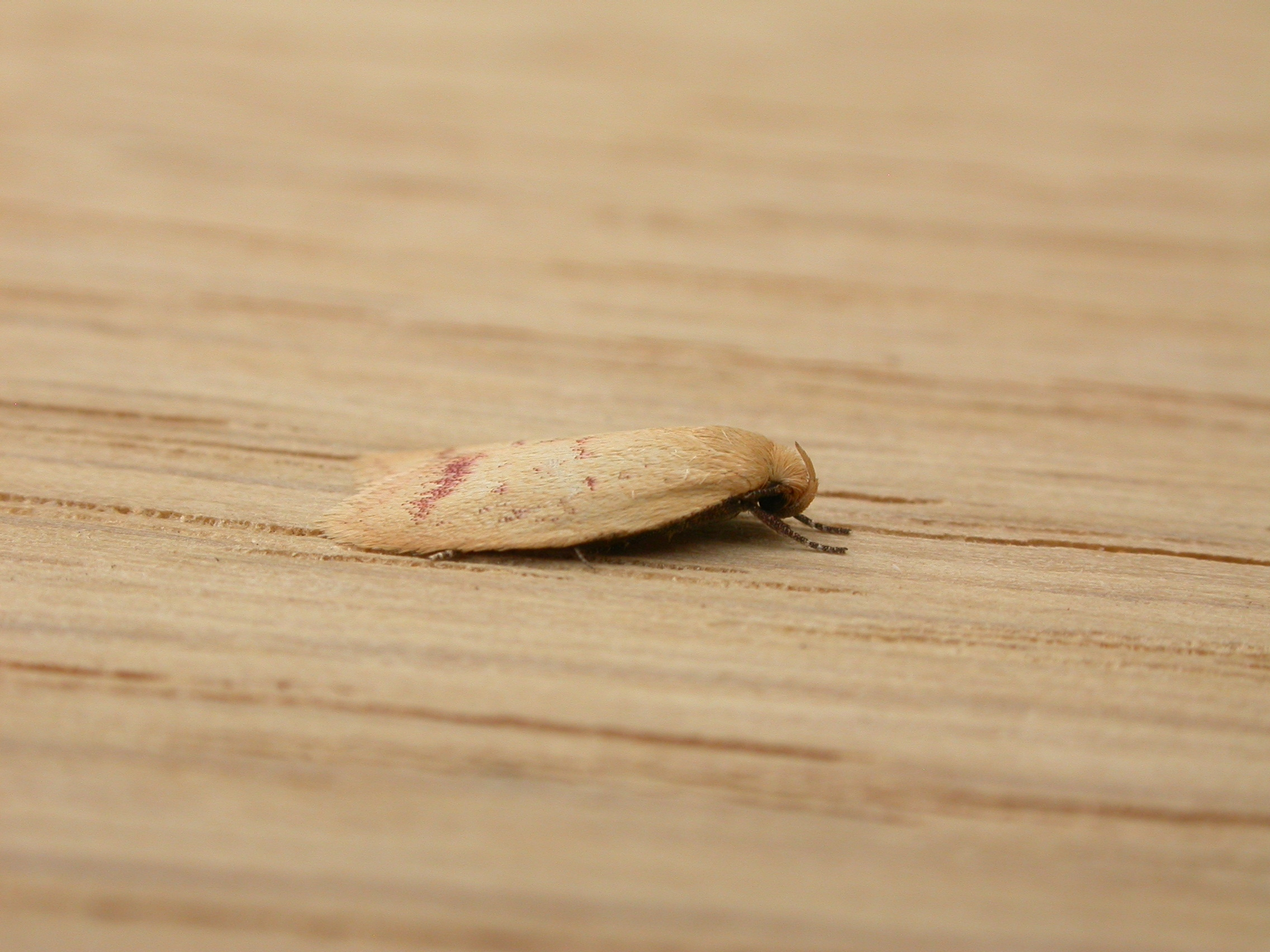

Scientific classification
- Kingdom: Animalia
- Phylum: Arthropoda
- Class: Insecta
- Order: Lepidoptera
- Family: Oecophoridae
- Genus: Heteroteucha
- Species: H. occidua

Binomial name
- Heteroteucha occidua (Meyrick, 1884)

Synonyms
- Philobota occidua Meyrick, 1884

= Heteroteucha occidua =

Species of moth

Heteroteucha occidua is a moth of the family Oecophoridae. It is known in Australia from the Australian Capital Territory, New South Wales, Queensland, Tasmania and Victoria.

The wingspan is 13–15 mm. The forewings are whitish-ochreous, sometimes irrorated (speckled) with carmine. There is a purplish-carmine dot in the disc before the middle, another on the fold slightly beyond it and a third in the disc beyond the middle. There is an erect purple-carmine streak from the anal angle, reaching half across the wing, as well as a purple-carmine streak along the hindmargin. The hindwings are grey-whitish, but greyer posteriorly.

The larvae feed on the dead leaves of Eucalyptus mannifera and Eucalyptus bicostata. They live in silked dead leaves.
