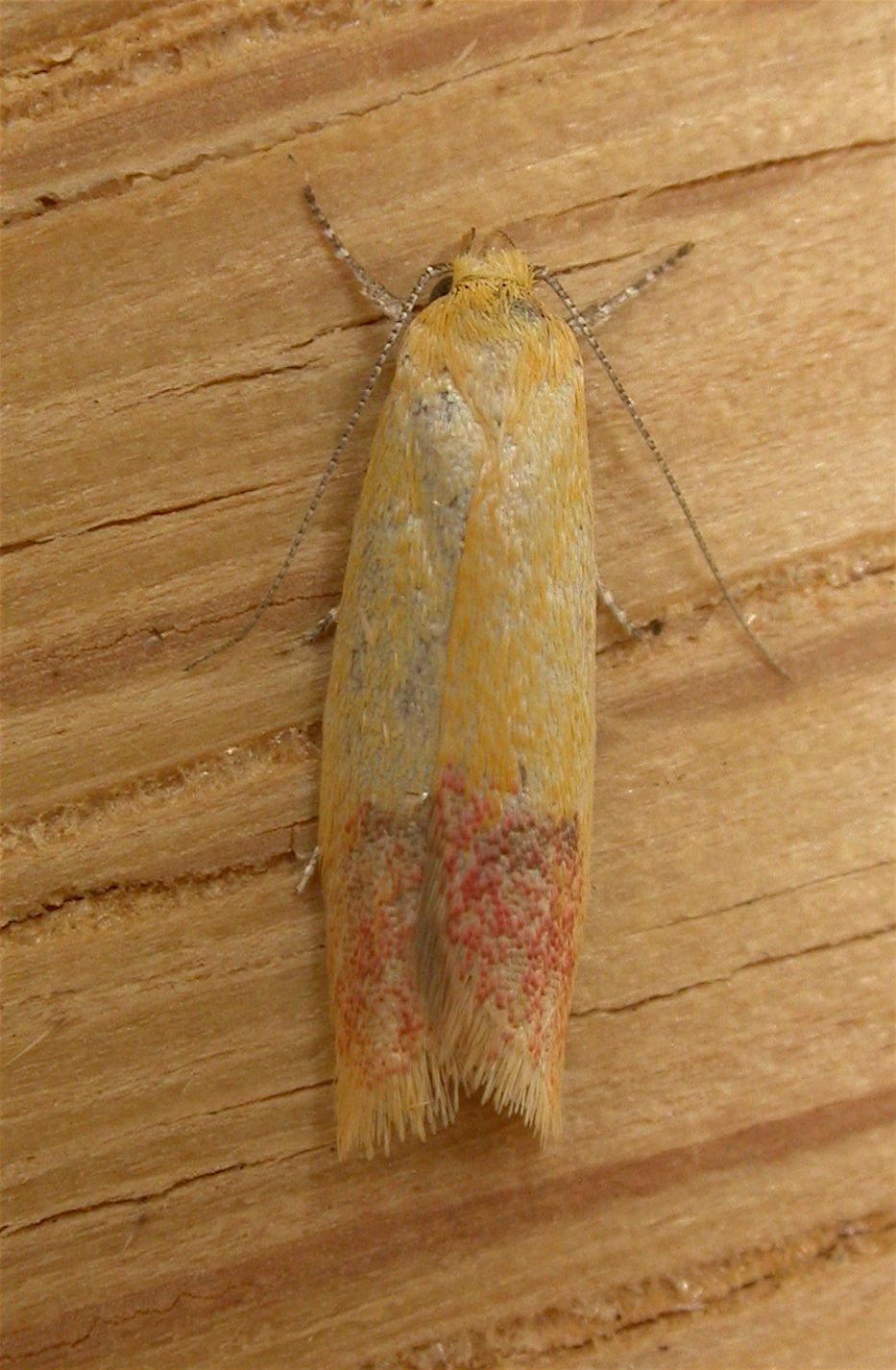
- Heteroteucha

Scientific classification
- Kingdom: Animalia
- Phylum: Arthropoda
- Class: Insecta
- Order: Lepidoptera
- Family: Oecophoridae
- Subfamily: Oecophorinae
- Genus: Heteroteucha; Common, 1994

Species
- See text.

= Heteroteucha =

Genus of moths

Heteroteucha is a genus of moths of the family Oecophoridae.

== Species ==
- Heteroteucha anthodora (Meyrick, 1884)
- Heteroteucha asema (Turner, 1917)
- Heteroteucha aspasia (Meyrick, 1884)
- Heteroteucha dichroella (Zeller, 1877)
- Heteroteucha dimochla (Turner, 1944)
- Heteroteucha distephana (Meyrick, 1884)
- Heteroteucha epistrepta (Turner, 1940)
- Heteroteucha initiata (Meyrick, 1920)
- Heteroteucha kershawi (Lower, 1893)
- Heteroteucha leptobaphes (Turner, 1944)
- Heteroteucha occidua (Meyrick, 1884)
- Heteroteucha ophthalmica (Meyrick, 1884)
- Heteroteucha paraclista (Meyrick, 1913)
- Heteroteucha parvula (Meyrick, 1884)
- Heteroteucha porphyryplaca (Lower, 1893)
- Heteroteucha rhoecosema (Turner, 1941)
- Heteroteucha rhoecozona (Turner, 1946)
- Heteroteucha stereomita (Turner, 1944)
- Heteroteucha subflava (Turner, 1944)
- Heteroteucha translatella (Walker, 1864)
- Heteroteucha tritoxantha (Meyrick, 1886)
- Heteroteucha xanthisma (Turner, 1917)
