= Heteroteucha rhoecozona =

Scientific classification
- Kingdom: Animalia
- Phylum: Arthropoda
- Clade: Pancrustacea
- Class: Insecta
- Order: Lepidoptera
- Family: Oecophoridae
- Genus: Heteroteucha
- Species: H. rhoecozona

Binomial name
- Heteroteucha rhoecozona (Turner, 1946)

Synonyms
- Machimia rhoecozona Turner, 1946

Species of moth

Heteroteucha rhoecozona is a moth in the family Oecophoridae. It was described by Alfred Jefferis Turner in 1946. It is found in Australia, where it has been recorded from New South Wales.

The wingspan is about 16 mm.
