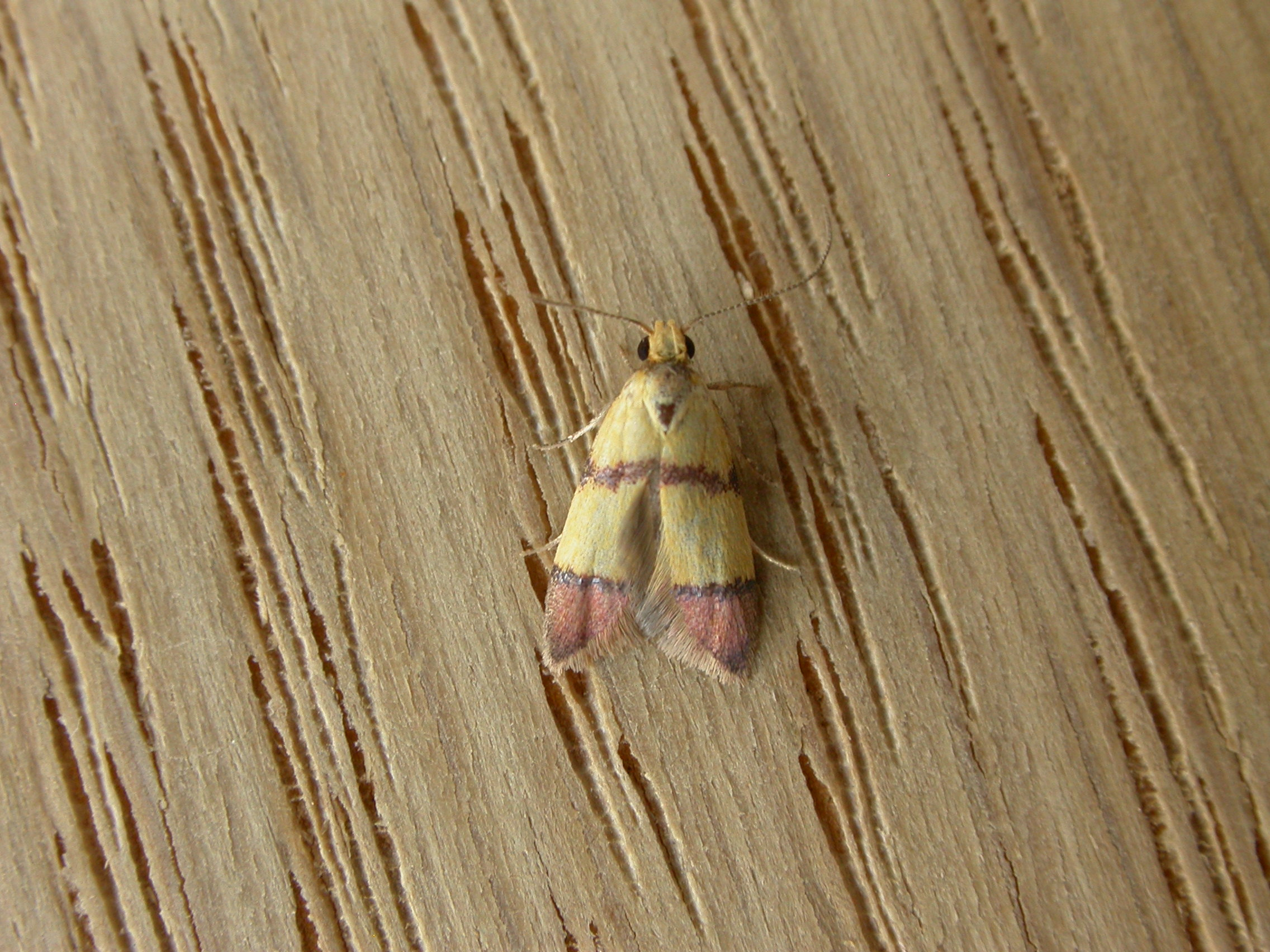

Scientific classification
- Kingdom: Animalia
- Phylum: Arthropoda
- Class: Insecta
- Order: Lepidoptera
- Family: Oecophoridae
- Genus: Heteroteucha
- Species: H. distephana

Binomial name
- Heteroteucha distephana (Meyrick, 1884)

Synonyms
- Coesyra distephana Meyrick, 1884; Ocystola exquisita Turner, 1944

= Heteroteucha distephana =

Species of moth

Heteroteucha distephana is a moth of the family Oecophoridae. It is found in Australia, in the states of New South Wales, Queensland and Victoria.

The wingspan is about 10 mm.

The larvae live in silked dead leaves. They feed on dead Eucalyptus leaves.
