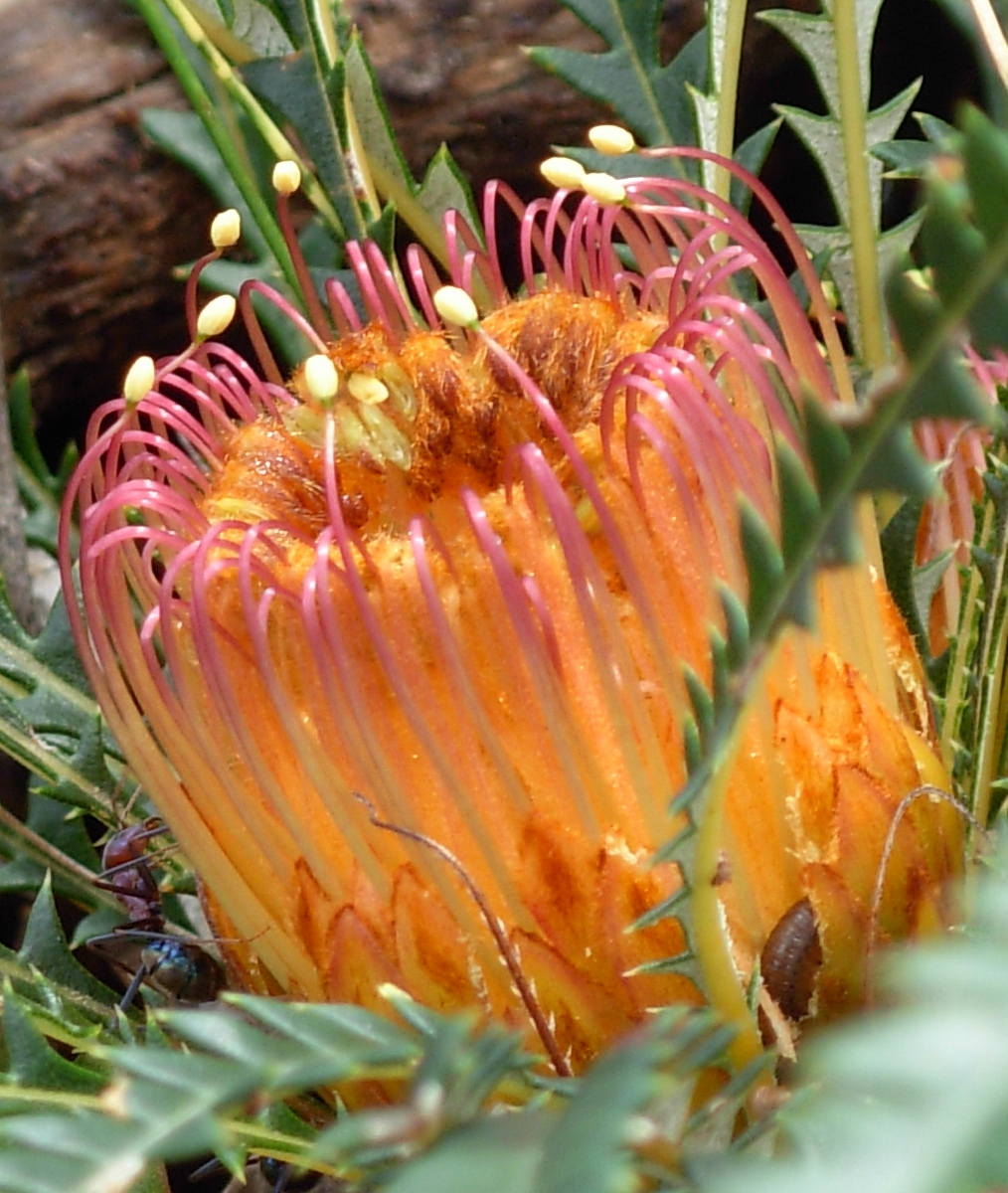
- Banksia nivea in Kalamunda National Park

Scientific classification
- Kingdom: Plantae
- Clade: Tracheophytes
- Clade: Angiosperms
- Clade: Eudicots
- Order: Proteales
- Family: Proteaceae
- Genus: Banksia
- Subgenus: Banksia subg. Banksia
- Series: Banksia ser. Dryandra
- Species: B. nivea

Binomial name
- Banksia nivea Labill.

Synonyms
- Dryandra nivea (Labill.) R.Br.; Dryandra nivea var. adscendens Endl. nom. illeg., nom. superfl.; Dryandra nivea var. venosa Meisn. nom. illeg., nom. superfl.; Josephia nivea (Labill.) Kuntze isonym; Josephia rachidifolia Knight nom. illeg.

= Banksia nivea =

Honeypot dryandra

Species of shrub in Western Australia

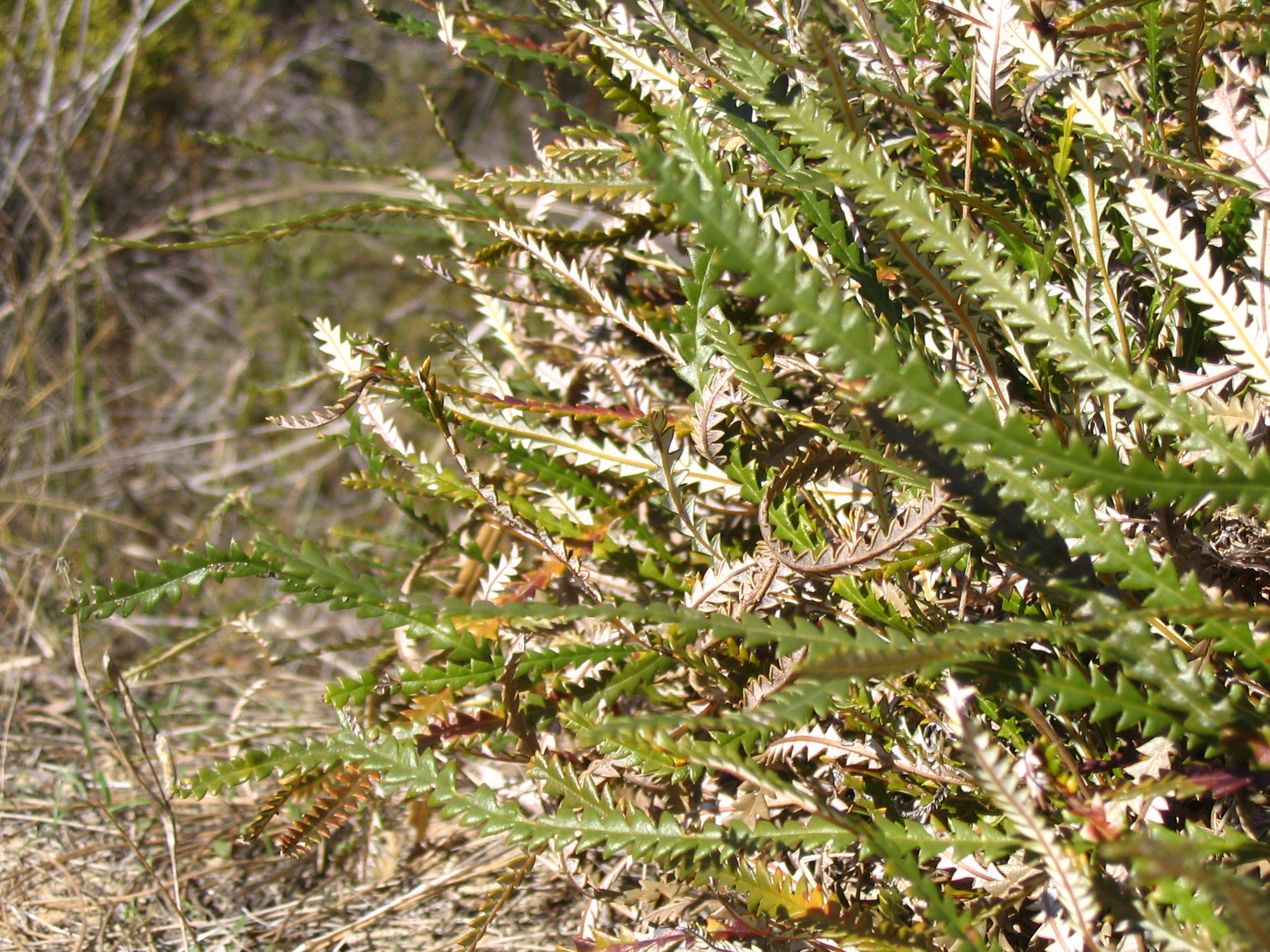
Foliage in Kings Park

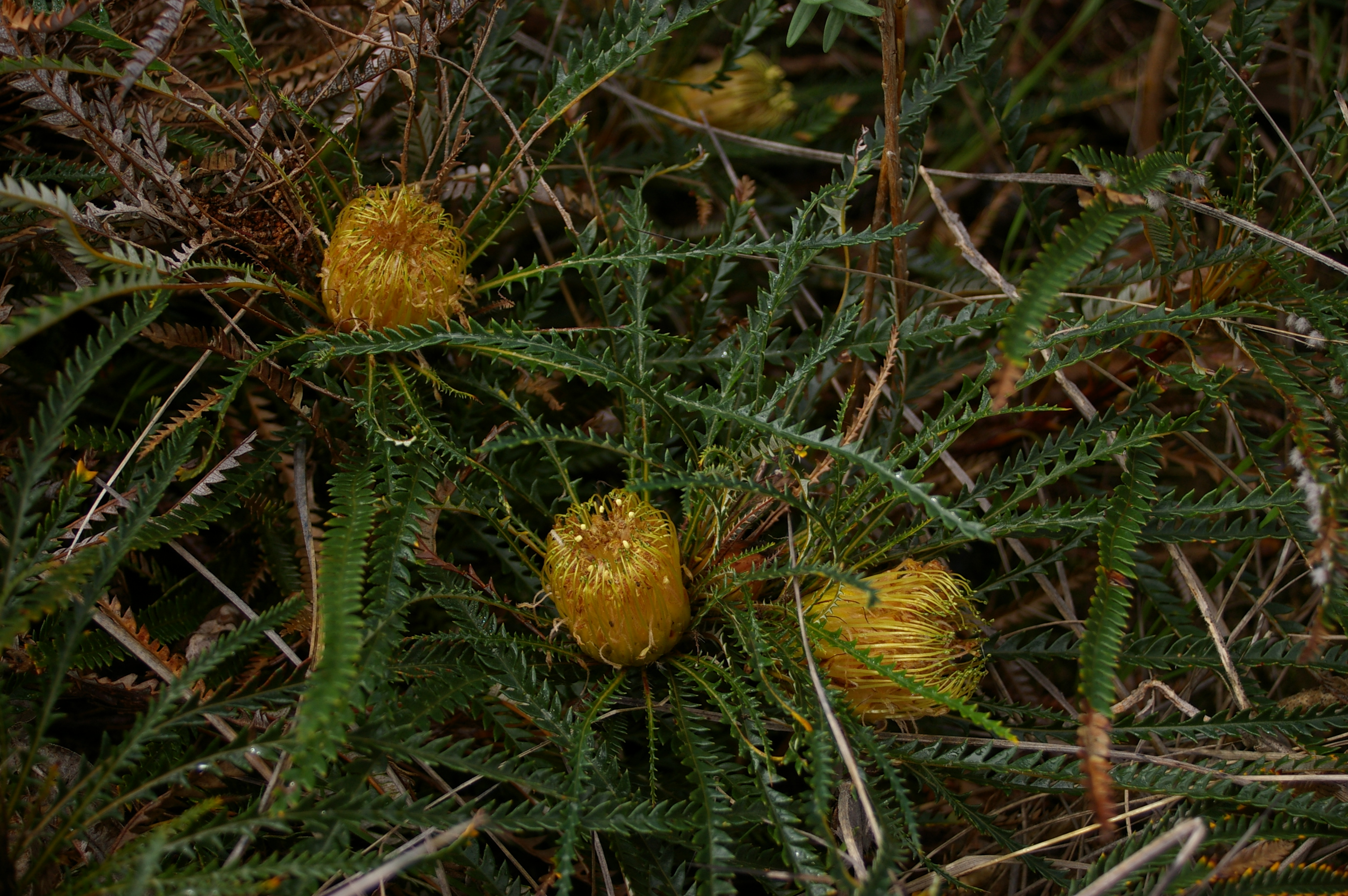
Near Lesmurdie Falls National Park

Banksia nivea, commonly known as honeypot dryandra, is a species of rounded shrub that is endemic to Western Australia. The Noongar peoples know the plant as bulgalla. It has linear, pinnatipartite leaves with triangular lobes, heads of cream-coloured and orange or red flowers and glabrous, egg-shaped follicles.

== Description ==
Banksia nivea is a rounded, much-branched shrub that typically grows to 1.3 m (4 ft 3 in) high and wide but does not form a lignotuber. It has linear, pinnatipartite leaves that are 200–450 mm (7.9–17.7 in) long and 3–10 mm (0.12–0.39 in) wide on a petiole 10–60 mm (0.39–2.36 in) long. There are between 45 and 85 triangular lobes on each side of the leaves. Between seventy and ninety cream-coloured and orange or red flowers are borne in head on the ends of branches with oblong to egg-shaped involucral bracts 18–22 mm (0.71–0.87 in) long at the base of the head. The perianth is 25–38 mm (0.98–1.50 in) long and the pistil 32–45 mm (1.3–1.8 in) long. Flowering occurs in April or from July to November and the follicles are egg-shaped, 9–13 mm (0.35–0.51 in) long and almost glabrous.

== Taxonomy and naming ==
Banksia nivea was first collected by Jacques Labillardière in the vicinity of Esperance Bay between 15 and 17 December 1792, during a search for the naturalist Claude Riche, who had become lost on the Australian mainland. Labillardière formally described and figured the species in Relation du Voyage à la Recherche de la Pérouse, his account of the voyage published in 1800.

In 1810 Robert Brown transferred it into a new genus, Dryandra as D. nivea.

In 1996, Alex George described two subspecies of Dryandra nivea:

- Dryandra nivea (Labill.) R.Br. var. nivea that has a pistil 32–40 mm (1.3–1.6 in) long and leaves 3–8 mm (0.12–0.31 in) wide;
- Dryandra nivea var. uliginosa A.S.George that has a pistil 41–45 mm (1.6–1.8 in) long and leaves 7–10 mm (0.28–0.39 in) wide.

In 2007 Austin Mast and Kevin Thiele transferred all Dryandra species into Banksia, reinstating Labillardière's Banksia nivea and renaming the two subspecies B. nivea Labill. subsp. nivea and B. nivea (A.S.George) A.R.Mast & K.R.Thiele subsp. uliginosa, the names accepted by the Australian Plant Census. A third subspecies (B. nivea subsp. Morangup (M.Pieroni 9/42) WA Herbarium) has been named but not yet formally described.

== Distribution and habitat ==
Honeypot dryandra is widespread between Lake Indoon (near Eneabba), Ongerup and Israelite Bay. Subspecies nivea grows in woodland and kwongan. Subspecies uliginosa has a narrow distribution from east of Busselton and on the Scott River plain where it grows in thick scrub.

== Ecology ==
Species of nectarivorous birds that have been observed feeding on B. nivea include Acanthorhynchus superciliosus (western spinebill). Black cockatoos have also been recorded feeding upon the seed, though it is not clear which species of black cockatoo was observed, Calyptorhynchus baudinii (Baudin's black cockatoo) or C. latirostris (Carnaby's black cockatoo).

== Conservation status ==
Subspecies nivea is classified as "not threatened" by the Western Australian Government Department of Parks and Wildlife, but subsp. uliginosa is classified as "Threatened Flora (Declared Rare Flora — Extant)" by the Department of Environment and Conservation (Western Australia).
