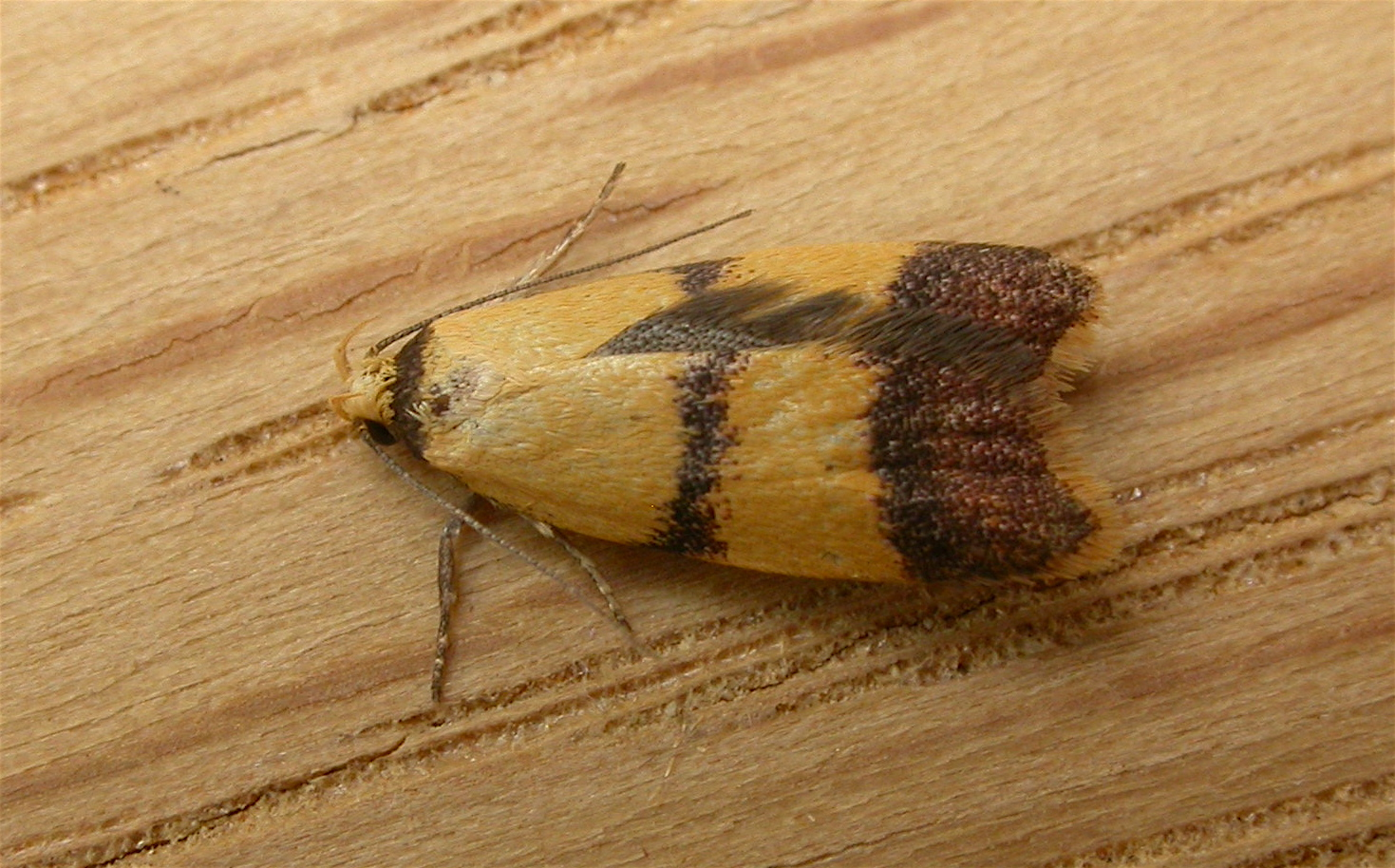

Scientific classification
- Kingdom: Animalia
- Phylum: Arthropoda
- Class: Insecta
- Order: Lepidoptera
- Family: Oecophoridae
- Genus: Heteroteucha
- Species: H. translatella

Binomial name
- Heteroteucha translatella (Walker, 1864)

Synonyms
- Oecophora translatella Walker, 1864; Coesyra iozona Meyrick, 1884; Coesyra dicoela Turner, 1896

= Heteroteucha translatella =

Species of moth

Heteroteucha translatella is a moth of the family Oecophoridae. It is found in Australia, where it has been recorded from Queensland, the Australian Capital Territory, Victoria and Tasmania.

The wingspan is about 15 mm.

== Life cycle ==
The larvae feed on Eucalyptus species, including Eucalyptus maculata. They shelter in the dead leaves of their host plant.
