= Jean-Baptiste Audebert =

French artist and naturalist (1759–1800)

- Born: 1759; Rochefort, France
- Died: December 1800 (aged 40–41)
- Known for: Histoire naturelle des singes (1800)
- Scientific career
- Fields: Artist and naturalist
- Author abbrev. (zoology): Audebert, Audeb.

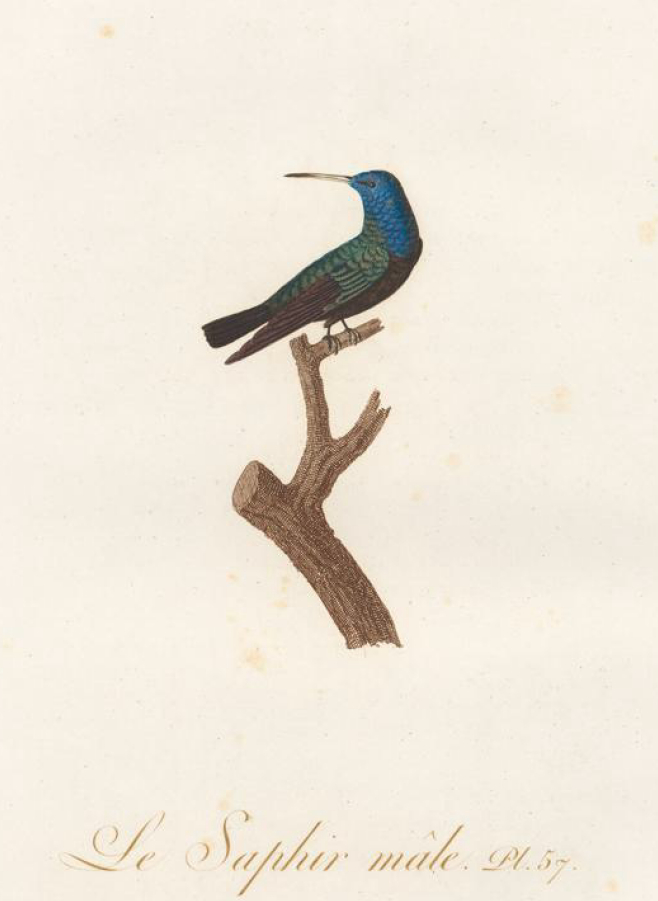
Sapphire bird, 1802

Jean Baptiste Audebert (1759 – December 1800) was a French artist and naturalist.

== Life ==
Audebert was born at Rochefort. He studied painting and drawing at Paris, and gained reputation as a miniature-painter. Employed in preparing plates for the Histoire des cloportes of Guillaume-Antoine Olivier, he acquired a taste for natural history. His first original work, Histoire naturelle des singes appeared in 1800, illustrated by sixty-two folio plates, drawn and engraved by himself. The coloring in these plates was unusually beautiful, and was applied by a method devised by himself.

His work was also included in the bestselling Relation du Voyage à la Recherche de la Pérouse.

Audebert died in Paris, leaving complete materials for another work, Histoire des colibris, oiseaux-mouches, jacamars et promerops, which was published in 1802. Two hundred copies were printed in folio, one hundred in large quarto, and fifteen were printed with the whole text in letters of gold. Another work, left unfinished, was also published after the author's death, L'Histoire des grimpereaux et des oiseaux de paradis. The last two works also appeared together in two volumes, Oiseaux dorés, ou à reflets métalliques (1801–1802), written with his friend Louis Pierre Vieillot. In this work he printed lines of gold and silver over the painted colours of the birds to give them a metallic sheen imitating the iridescent colours of nature.
