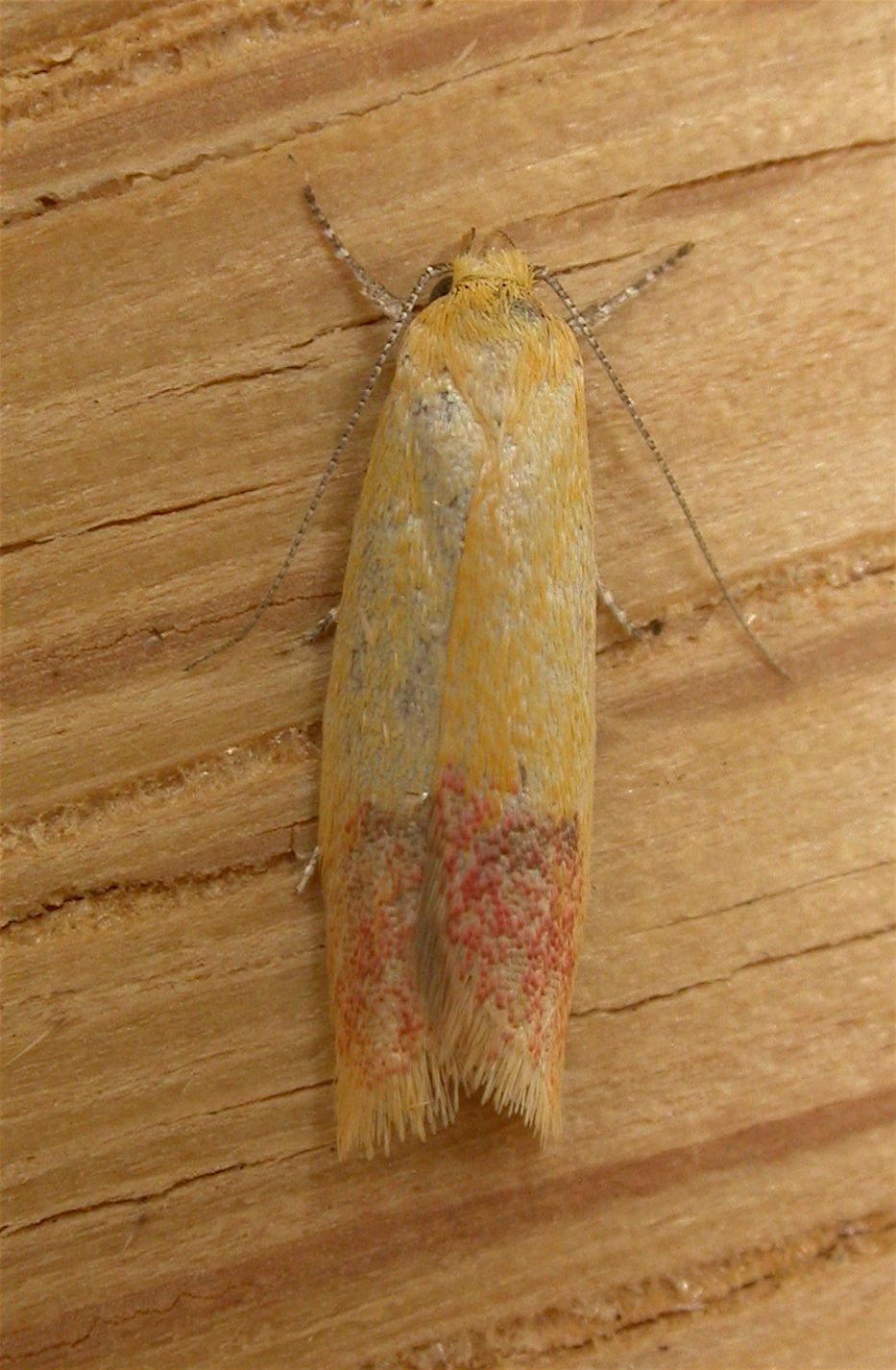

Scientific classification
- Kingdom: Animalia
- Phylum: Arthropoda
- Class: Insecta
- Order: Lepidoptera
- Family: Oecophoridae
- Genus: Heteroteucha
- Species: H. parvula

Binomial name
- Heteroteucha parvula (Meyrick, 1884)

Synonyms
- Coesyra parvula Meyrick, 1884

= Heteroteucha parvula =

Species of moth

Heteroteucha parvula is a moth of the family Oecophoridae. It is found in Australia, where it has been recorded from Queensland, New South Wales, the Australian Capital Territory, Victoria, Tasmania and South Australia.

The wingspan is about 15 mm.

The larvae feed on the leaves of Leptospermum species.
