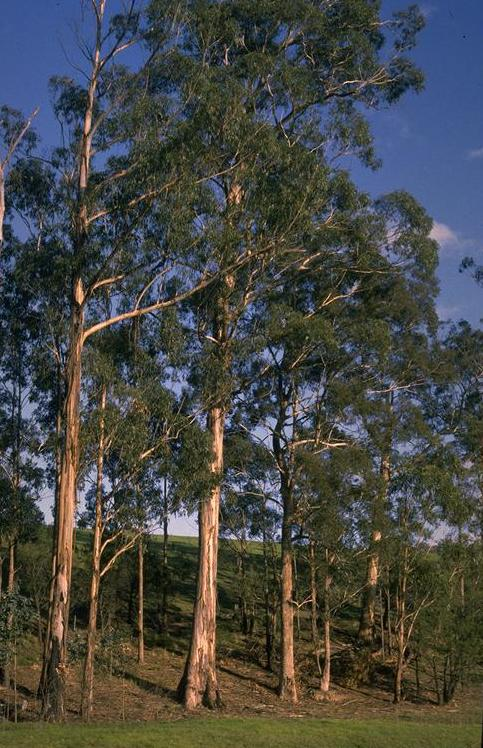

Scientific classification
- Kingdom: Plantae
- Clade: Embryophytes
- Clade: Tracheophytes
- Clade: Spermatophytes
- Clade: Angiosperms
- Clade: Eudicots
- Clade: Rosids
- Order: Myrtales
- Family: Myrtaceae
- Genus: Eucalyptus
- Species: E. globulus
- Subspecies: E. g. subsp. maidenii

Trinomial name
- Eucalyptus globulus subsp. maidenii (F.Muell.) J.B.Kirkp.

Synonyms
- Eucalyptus maideni F.Muell. orth. var.; Eucalyptus maidenii F.Muell.; Eucalyptus maidenii F.Muell. var. maidenii

= Eucalyptus globulus subsp. maidenii =

Maiden's gum

Subspecies of eucalyptus

Eucalyptus globulus subsp. maidenii, commonly known as Maiden's gum, is a subspecies of tree that is endemic to southeastern Australia. It has mostly smooth bark with some persistent slabs of old bark at the base, juvenile leaves with one glaucous side, lance-shaped adult leaves, flower buds arranged in groups of seven, white flowers and conical, pedicellate, sometimes glaucous fruit that is more or less square in cross-section

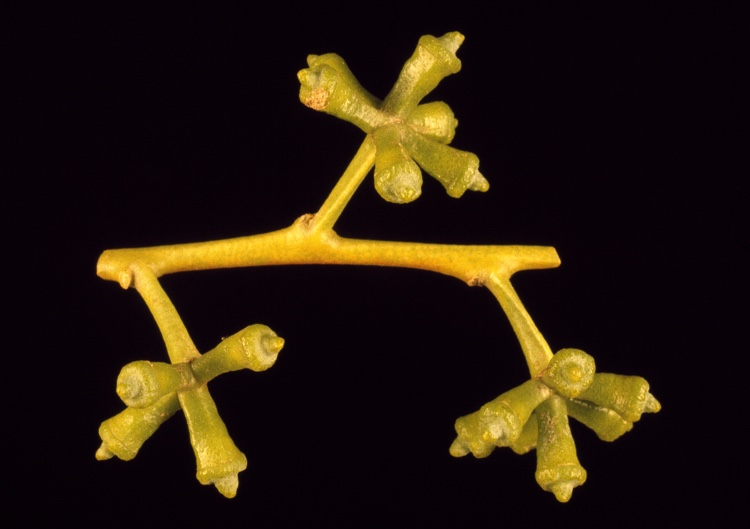
Flower buds

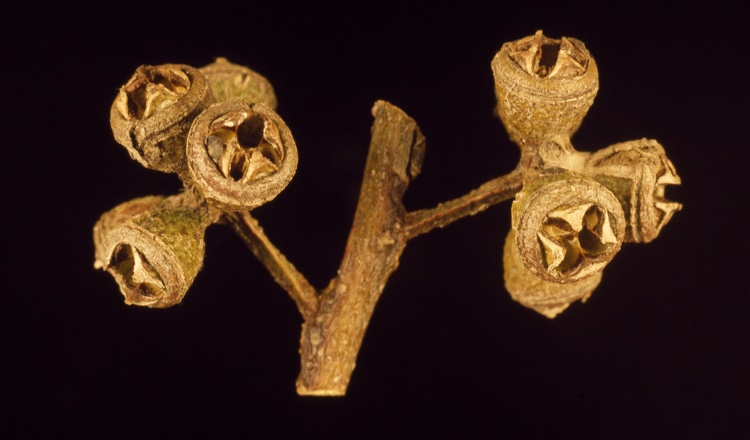
Fruit

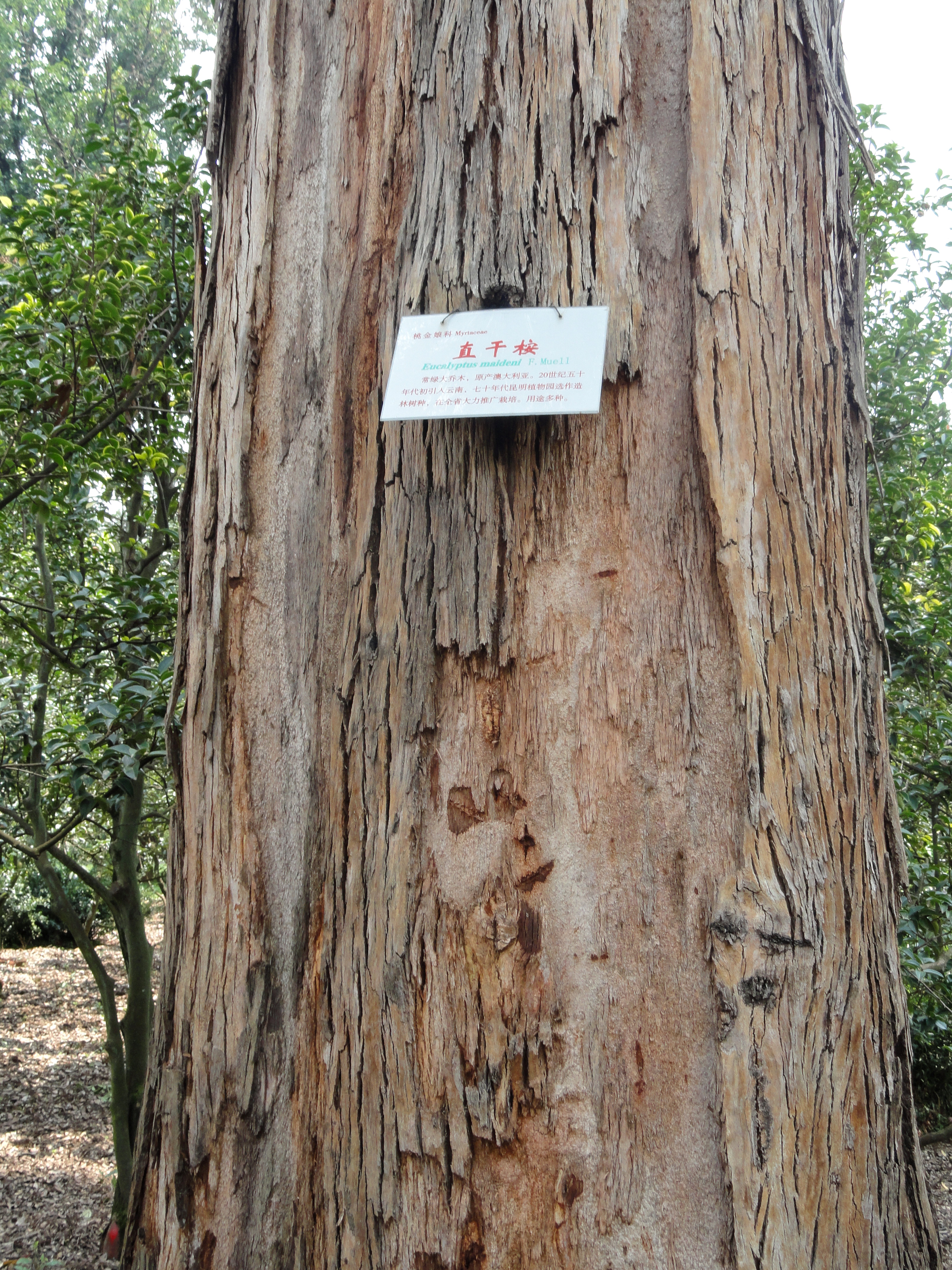
Trunk of tree in Kunming Botanical Garden, China

== Description ==
Eucalyptus globulus subsp. maidenii is a tree that typically grows to a height of 45–50 m (148–164 ft) and forms a lignotuber. The bark is mostly smooth, shedding in long strips to leave a white or greyish surface. There is sometimes rough, partially shed bark at the base of the trunk and ribbons of shedding bark in the upper branches. Young plants and coppice regrowth have stems that are more or less square in cross-section, with a prominent wing on each corner. The juvenile leaves are sessile, arranged in opposite pairs, elliptic to egg-shaped, the lower surface covered by a white, waxy bloom, 40–110 mm (1.6–4.3 in) long and 17–60 mm (0.67–2.36 in) wide. Adult leaves are arranged alternately, the same shade of green on both sides, lance-shaped to curved, 120–355 mm (4.7–14.0 in) long and 12–40 mm (0.47–1.57 in) wide on a petiole 15–37 mm (0.59–1.46 in) long.

The flower buds are arranged in leaf axils in groups of seven on a flattened peduncle 8–25 mm (0.31–0.98 in) long, the individual buds on a thickened pedicel 3–8 mm (0.12–0.31 in) long. Mature buds are club-shaped to pear-shaped, 8–11 mm (0.31–0.43 in) long and 5–7 mm (0.20–0.28 in) wide with a beaked or flattened operculum that has a central knob. Flowering has been recorded in March and the flowers are white. The fruit is a woody, conical, sometimes glaucous capsule, 5–8 mm (0.20–0.31 in) long and 6–10 mm (0.24–0.39 in) wide with the valves at about rim level.

== Taxonomy and naming ==
Maiden's gum was first formally described in 1890 by Ferdinand von Mueller who gave it the name Eucalyptus maidenii and published the description in Proceedings of the Linnean Society of New South Wales from collections by William Bäuerlen. In 1974, James Barrie Kirkpatrick described four subspecies of E. globulus and changed the name E. maidenii to E. globulus subsp. maidenii. The epithet maidenii honours Joseph Maiden.

== Distribution and habitat ==
This subspecies of E. globulus grows in forest in mountain valleys, on slopes and ridges in near-coastal ranges of New South Wales south of the Shoalhaven River and in eastern Victoria near the upper reaches of the Genoa and Cann Rivers.
