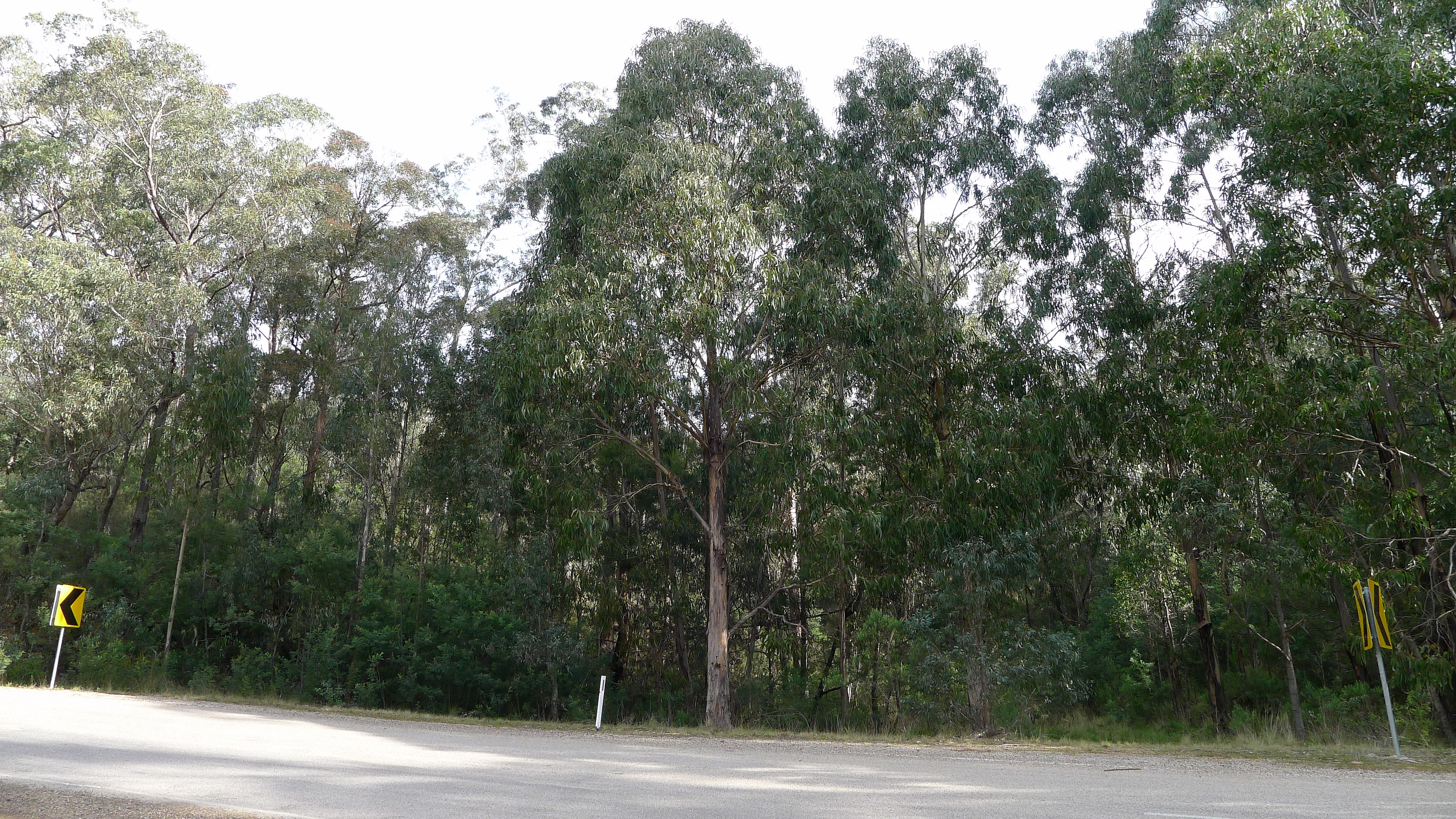
- E. globulus subsp. pseudoglobulus near Waterford in Gippsland

Scientific classification
- Kingdom: Plantae
- Clade: Embryophytes
- Clade: Tracheophytes
- Clade: Spermatophytes
- Clade: Angiosperms
- Clade: Eudicots
- Clade: Rosids
- Order: Myrtales
- Family: Myrtaceae
- Genus: Eucalyptus
- Species: E. globulus
- Subspecies: E. g. subsp. pseudoglobulus

Trinomial name
- Eucalyptus globulus subsp. pseudoglobulus (Naudin) J.B.Kirkp.

Synonyms
- Eucalyptus globulus var. pseudoglobulus Naudin; Eucalyptus globulus var. stjohni R.T.Baker orth. var.; Eucalyptus globulus var. stjohnii R.T.Baker; Eucalyptus pseudoglobulus (Naudin) Maiden; Eucalyptus st-johni R.T.Baker orth. var.; Eucalyptus stjohnii (R.T.Baker) R.T.Baker

= Eucalyptus globulus subsp. pseudoglobulus =

Victorian eurabbie

Subspecies of eucalyptus

Eucalyptus globulus subsp. pseudoglobulus, commonly known as Victorian eurabbie, is one of the four subspecies of Eucalyptus globulus and is endemic to southeastern Australia. It has mostly smooth bark with some persistent slabs of old bark at the base, juvenile leaves with one glaucous side, glossy, lance-shaped adult leaves, pedicellate flower buds in groups of three, white flowers and conical fruit.

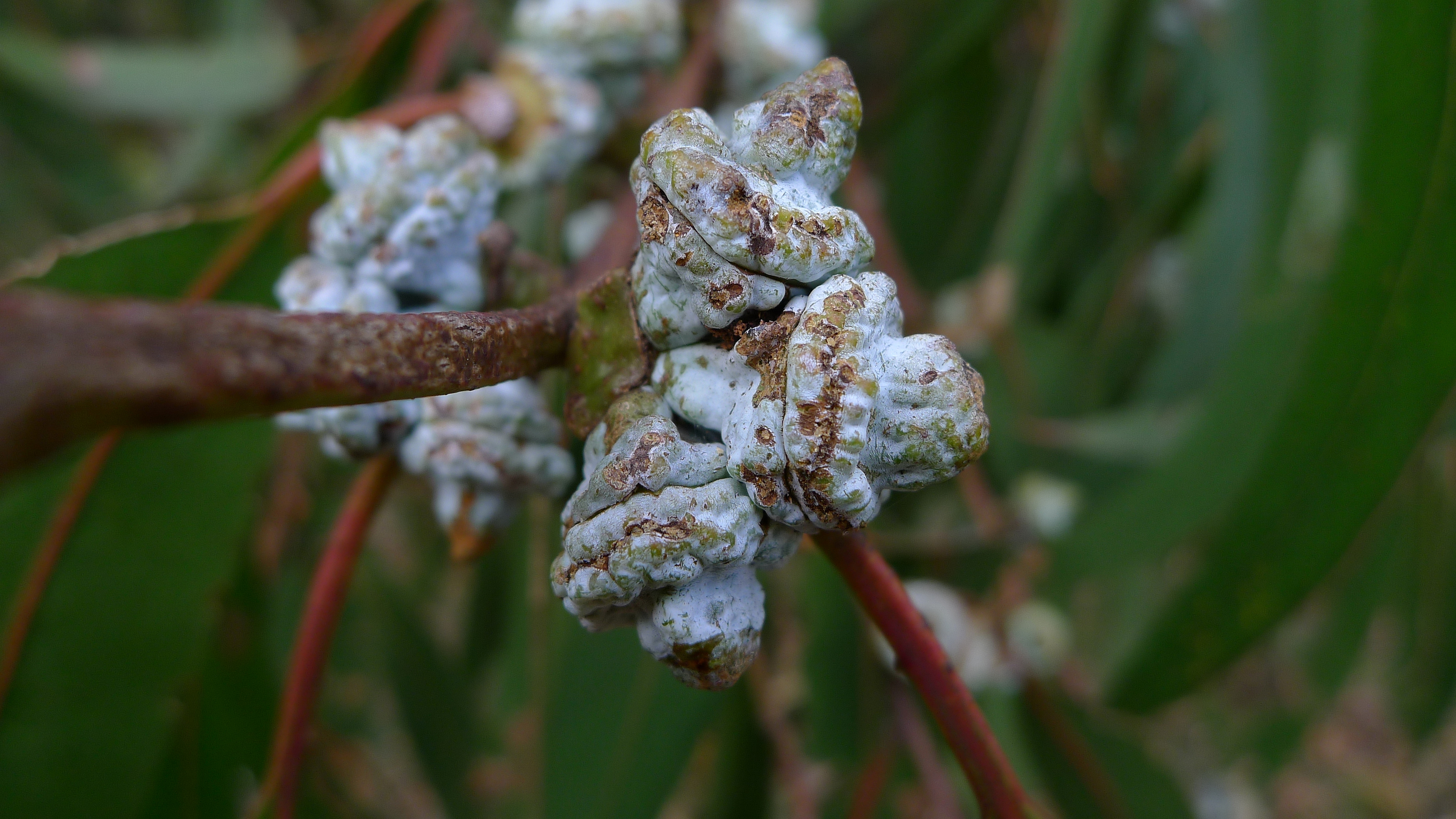
Flower buds

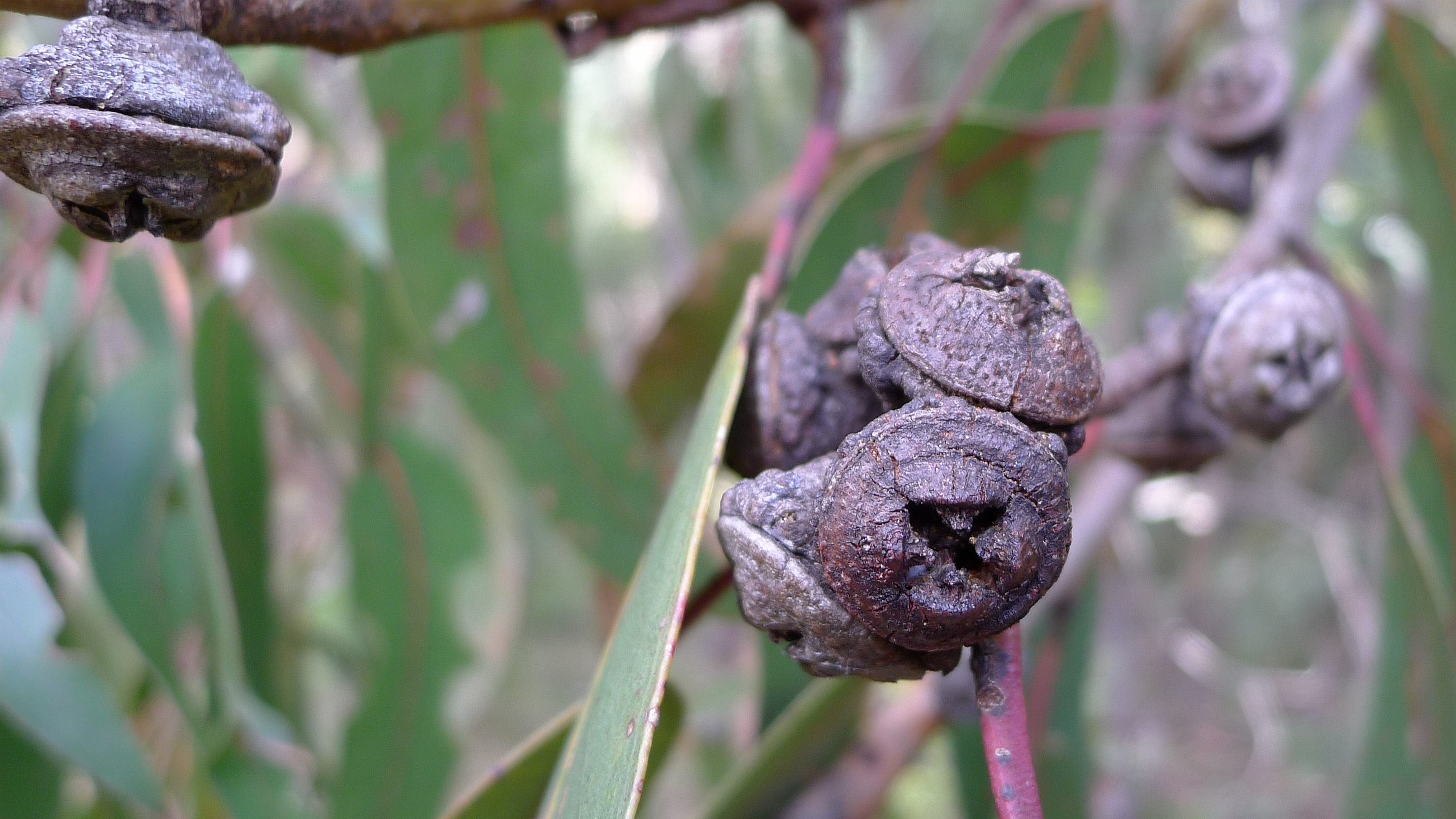
Fruit

== Description ==
Eucalyptus globulus subsp. pseudoglobulus is a tree that typically grows to a height of 45 m (148 ft) and forms a lignotuber. The bark is mostly smooth, shedding in long strips to leave a white or greyish surface. There is sometimes rough, partially shed bark at the base of the trunk and ribbons of shedding bark in the upper branches. Young plants and coppice regrowth have stems that are glaucous and more or less square in cross-section, with a prominent wing on each corner. The juvenile leaves are sessile, arranged in opposite pairs, elliptic to egg-shaped, the lower surface covered by a white, waxy bloom, 33–100 mm (1.3–3.9 in) long and 20–60 mm (0.79–2.36 in) wide. Adult leaves are arranged alternately, the same glossy green on both sides, lance-shaped to curved, 130–350 mm (5.1–13.8 in) long and 15–45 mm (0.59–1.77 in) wide on a petiole 15–38 mm (0.59–1.50 in) long.

The flower buds are arranged in leaf axils in groups of three on a thick peduncle 3–10 mm (0.12–0.39 in) long, the individual buds sessile or on a pedicel up to 5 mm (0.20 in) long. Mature buds are club-shaped to pear-shaped, 9–12 mm (0.35–0.47 in) long and 7–8 mm (0.28–0.31 in) wide with a flattened operculum that has a central knob. Flowering has been recorded in February and the flowers are white. The fruit is a woody, conical capsule, 6–8 mm (0.24–0.31 in) long and 9–12 mm (0.35–0.47 in) wide with the valves protruding slightly above rim level.

== Taxonomy and naming ==
Victorian eurabbie was first formally described in 1891 by Charles Naudin who gave it the name Eucalyptus globulus var. pseudoglobulus and published the description in his book Description and emploi des Eucalyptus: introduits en Europe principalement en France et en Algerie: second memoire. In 1974, James Barrie Kirkpatrick described four subspecies, including changing the name of E. globulus var. pseudoglobulus to E. globulus subsp. pseudoglobulus.

== Distribution and habitat ==
Victorian eurabbie grows in forest on the slopes of valleys and hills from the Nadgee Nature Reserve in far southeastern New South Wales to the coastal ranges of eastern Gippsland in Victoria.
