= Relation du Voyage à la Recherche de la Pérouse =

1800 book by Jacques Labillardière

Relation du Voyage à la Recherche de la Pérouse is an 1800 book that gives an account of the 1791–1793 d'Entrecasteaux expedition to Australasia. The title refers to the search for La Pérouse, who disappeared in the region in 1788, a popular, though unsuccessful, object of the mission. Many of the discoveries made by the scientists attached to the expedition were published in the two volumes. The author, Jacques Labillardière, was a French botanist on the voyage, engaged to collect and describe the flora of the continent. The work includes some of the earliest descriptions of Australian flora and fauna, and an account of the indigenous peoples of Tasmania.

The work also contains the second ever description of an Australian spider, the species Trichonephila edulis. Labillardière also describes seeing a dog-sized animal, and discovering the remains of a carnivorous animal, what is considered to be the first European report of a thylacine. The author of the first description, George Harris, cites this work in an 1804 letter regarding rumours of such an animal.

Labillardière's work was published in two volumes, becoming very popular and translated into English in the same year; Voyage in search of La Pérouse (four editions) was issued by John Stockdale with similar success. The contents include his description of the journey, an atlas, and illustrations of ethnographic and natural history subjects. The work is noted for its early botanical illustrations of Redouté, birds by Jean-Baptiste Audebert, and engravings produced from the surviving illustrations of Piron.

The first description of a West Australian eucalypt, Eucalyptus cornuta, and the widely cultivated Eucalyptus globulus are amongst the newly discovered species and genera of flora. Those discovered while anchored at Observatory Island, Esperance Bay, include Banksia nivea, Banksia repens, Anigozanthus rufus and Chorizema ilicifolia. The botanical descriptions were based on the extensive collections made by Labillardière during the expedition's stop at Esperance Bay, and the two visits to Tasmania. The abbreviation Voy.Rech.Perouse is used to refer to this work in botanical literature.

The book was published during a time of great interest in the flora of Australia. It was preceded by A specimen of the botany of New Holland (1793–1795), the first book devoted to the subject. The botanist Robert Brown took a copy of this work on his journey to Australia in 1801, enquiring in his letters home as to whether Labillardière had published his flora. This anticipated work, Labillardière's Novae Hollandiae plantarum specimen (1804–1806), was published before Brown's more comprehensive Prodromus.

This work preceded Rossel's English publication of the d’Entrecasteaux journal, Voyage de d’Entrecasteaux envoyage à la recherche de La Pérouse, by nine years.
