= Joseph Maiden =

Anglo-Australian botanist (1859–1925)

Joseph Henry Maiden
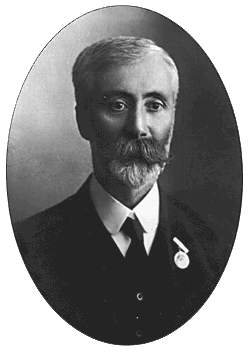
- Born: 25 April 1859; St. John's Wood, England
- Died: 16 November 1925 (aged 66); Turramurra, New South Wales
- Awards: Imperial Service Order Linnean Medal in 1915; Mueller Medal in 1923; Clarke Medal of the Royal Society of New South Wales in 1924
- Scientific career
- Fields: botany
- Workplaces: Royal Society
- Author abbrev. (botany): Maiden

Joseph Henry Maiden ISO (25 April 1859 – 16 November 1925) was a botanist who made a major contribution to knowledge of the Australian flora, especially the genus Eucalyptus. He is denoted by the author abbreviation Maiden when citing a botanical name.

== Life ==
Joseph Maiden was born in St John's Wood in northwest London. He studied science at the University of London, but due to ill health he did not complete the course. As part of his treatment he was advised to take a long sea voyage, and so in 1880 he sailed for New South Wales. In 1881, Maiden was appointed first curator of the Technological Museum in Sydney (now the Powerhouse Museum), remaining there until 1896. While there, he published an article in 1886 describing what he called "some sixteenth century maps of Australia". These were the so-called Dieppe maps, the Rotz (1547), the Harleian or Dauphin (mid-1540s), and the Desceliers (1550), photo-lithographic reproductions of which had been published by the British Museum in 1885. He was much interested in the native plants, and in his early days was associated with the Rev. William Woolls in his botanical studies. After his first collection of plants were destroyed in a fire at the Garden Palace near Sydney Botanic Gardens in 1882, he amassed a new collection, which was housed in part of an exhibition hall in the Outer Domain, behind Sydney Hospital. This collection formed the basis for his first book, The Useful Native Plants of Australia, published in 1889, in which he acknowledged his debt to the work of Ferdinand von Mueller with whom he had been in correspondence.

In 1890 he was appointed consulting botanist to the Department of Agriculture and in 1894 was made Superintendent of Technical Education. In 1892 he published a Bibliography of Australian Economic Botany. In 1896, Maiden was appointed Government Botanist and Director of the Botanic Gardens, succeeding Charles Moore, who had been one of his botanical mentors. He immediately set about establishing the colony's first herbarium, as well as a museum, library and Sydney's first playground. He had in the previous year brought out Part I of The Flowering Plants and Ferns of New South Wales, of which other parts appeared in this and in later years. Another valuable work, the Forest Flora of New South Wales, was published in parts between 1904 and 1924, and his Illustrations of New South Wales Plants began to appear in 1907. In 1909 Maiden published Sir Joseph Banks the "father of Australia". In 1916, in collaboration with Ernst Betche, he published A Census of New South Wales Plants, and in 1920 Maiden published Part I of The Weeds of New South Wales.

Maiden became the recognised authority on Acacia and Eucalyptus. He published about 45 papers, and his eight-volume A Critical Revision of the Genus Eucalyptus remained a major reference for over fifty years. He convinced his co-author, the artist Margaret Flockton, to delay her retirement for five years to complete the illustrations. He was the author of numerous species and the collector of type material for many more. His other interests included reducing sand erosion, promoting wattle cultivation for the tanning industry, and control (or use) of prickly pear. He served as secretary of the (Royal) Geographical Society of Australasia, lectured in agricultural botany and forestry at the University of Sydney, and was a trustee of the Rookwood Church of England Cemetery. He was an active office-bearer in the Royal and Linnean societies of New South Wales, the (Royal) Australian Historical Society, the Wattle Day League, the Horticultural Society and Horticultural Association, the Field Naturalists' Society, the Town Planning Association of New South Wales, and the Australasian Association for the Advancement of Science, which awarded him with its Mueller Medal in 1923.

Joseph Maiden retired in 1924, and died at Turramurra, Sydney. Eucalyptus maidenii is named in his honour. He was also appointed a Companion of the Imperial Service Order in 1916.

== See also ==
- List of Australian plant species authored by Joseph Maiden
- Margaret Flockton, illustrator for the Botanic Gardens and of A Critical Revision of the Genus Eucalyptus.

Awards
Preceded by Walter Baldwin Spencer	Clarke Medal; 1924	Succeeded by Charles Hedley
