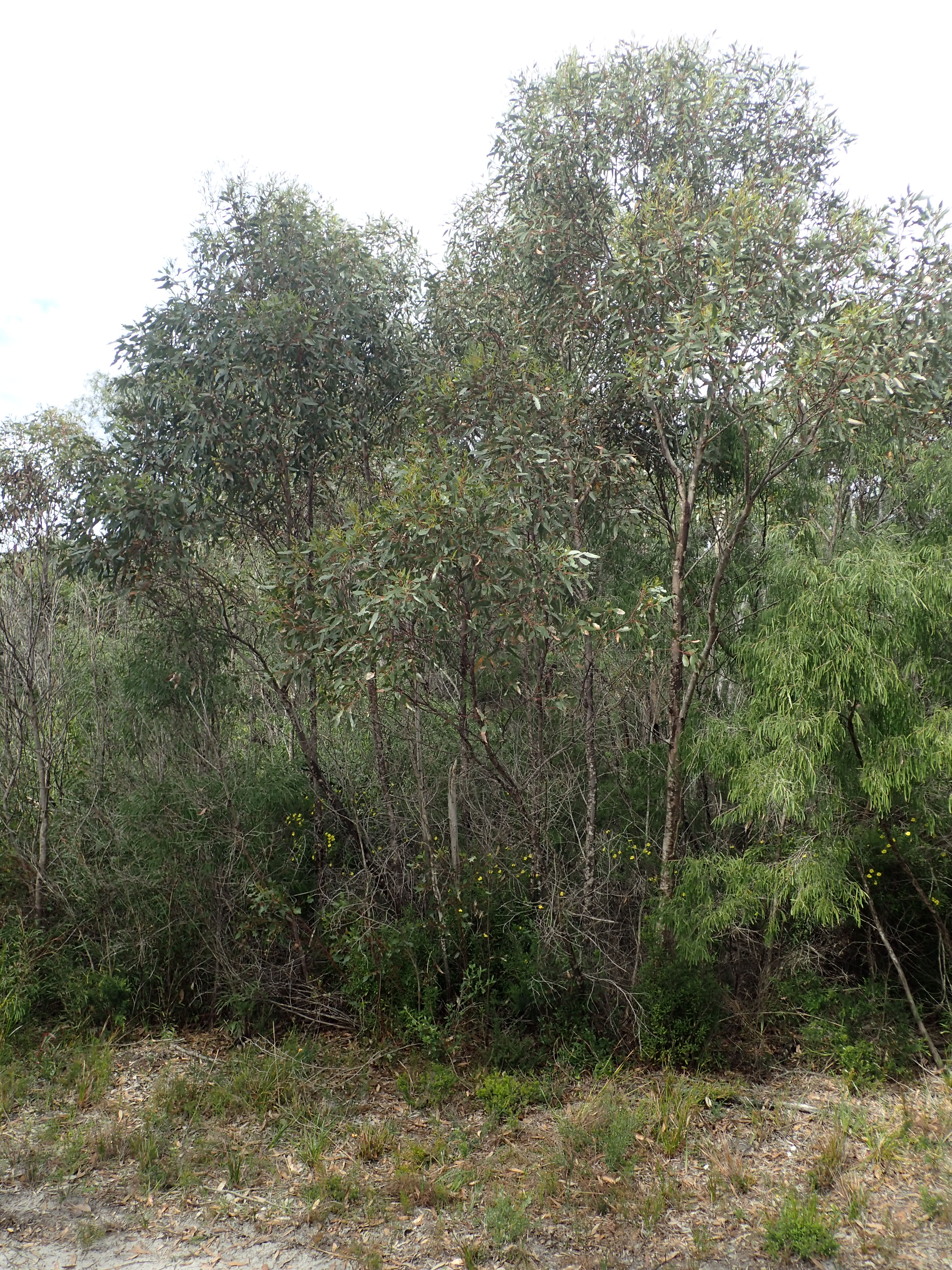
- Eucalyptus goniantha in Torndirrup National Park

Scientific classification
- Kingdom: Plantae
- Clade: Embryophytes
- Clade: Tracheophytes
- Clade: Spermatophytes
- Clade: Angiosperms
- Clade: Eudicots
- Clade: Rosids
- Order: Myrtales
- Family: Myrtaceae
- Genus: Eucalyptus
- Species: E. goniantha

Binomial name
- Eucalyptus goniantha Turcz.

Synonyms
- Eucalyptus incrassata var. goniantha (Turcz.) Maiden

= Eucalyptus goniantha =

Jerdacuttup mallee

Species of eucalyptus

Eucalyptus goniantha, commonly known as Jerdacuttup mallee, is a species of mallee, or rarely a tree, that is endemic to Western Australia. It has smooth bark, lance-shaped adult leaves, flower buds in groups of between seven and eleven, creamy white flowers and more or less ribbed, hemispherical fruit.

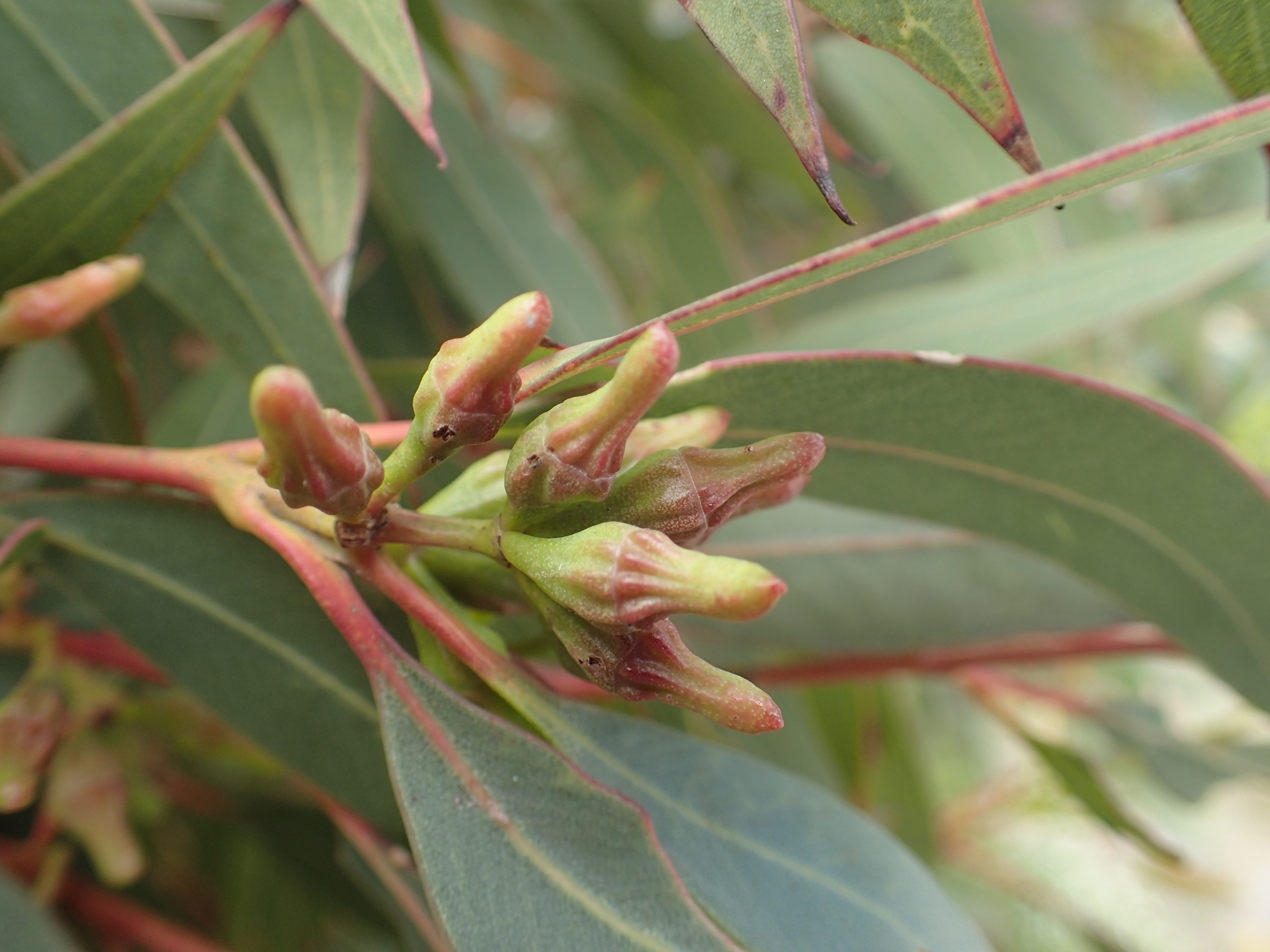
Flower buds of subsp. goniantha

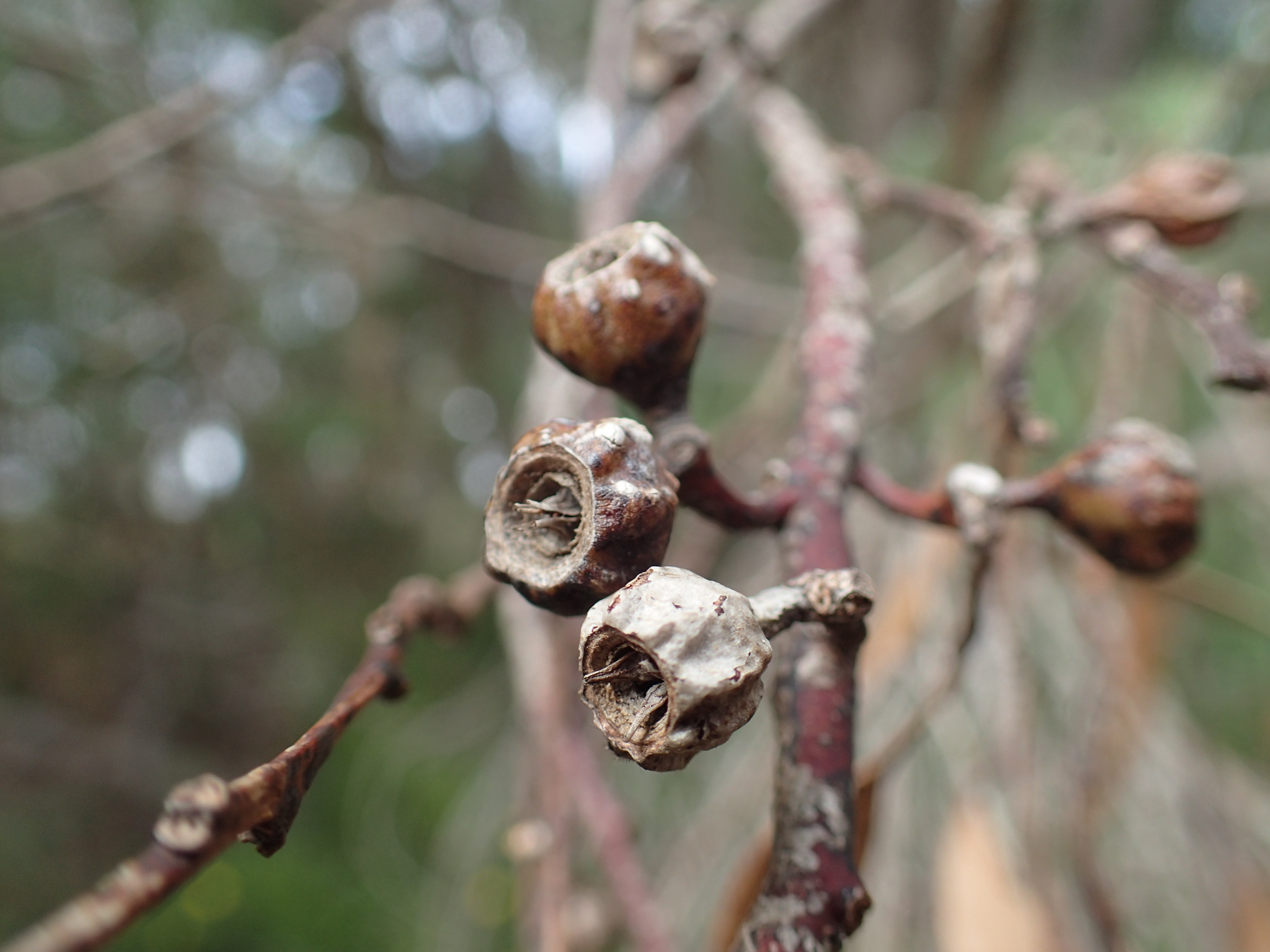
Fruit of subspecies goniantha

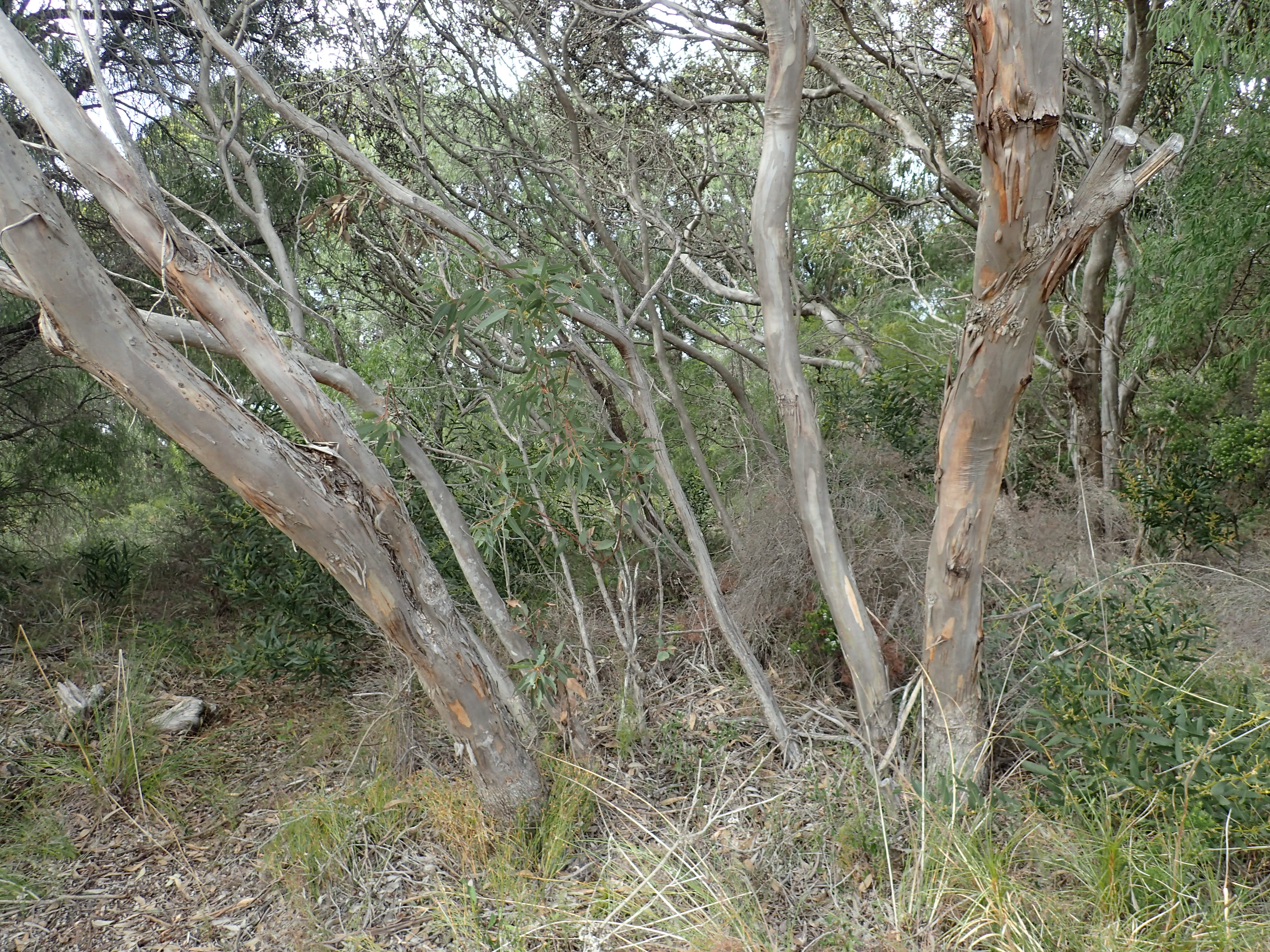
Bark

== Description ==
Eucalyptus goniantha is a mallee, rarely a tree, that typically grows to a height of 1.5–10 m (4 ft 11 in – 32 ft 10 in) and forms a lignotuber. It has smooth, grey to pale brown bark. Young plants and coppice regrowth have leaves that are oblong to egg-shaped or almost round. Adult leaves are lance-shaped, 80–135 mm (3.1–5.3 in) long and 20–32 mm (0.79–1.26 in) wide on a petiole 10–23 mm (0.39–0.91 in) long. The flower buds are arranged in leaf axils in groups of seven, nine or eleven on an unbranched peduncle 11–15 mm (0.43–0.59 in) long, the individual buds on pedicels 2–10 mm (0.079–0.394 in) long. Mature buds are oval, creamy yellow, 8–11 mm (0.31–0.43 in) long and 6–8 mm (0.24–0.31 in) wide with a rounded to bluntly beaked operculum. Flowering mainly occurs from November to January and the flowers are creamy white. The fruit is a woody hemispherical to shortened spherical capsule 7–11 mm (0.28–0.43 in) long and 8–14 mm (0.31–0.55 in) wide, strongly or weakly ribbed, with the valves protruding but fragile.

== Taxonomy and naming ==
Eucalyptus goniantha was first formally described in 1847 by Nikolai Turczaninow in Bulletin de la Société Impériale des Naturalistes de Moscou. In 1976, Ian Brooker described subspecies goniantha and semiglobosa, but only subsp. goniantha has been accepted by the Australian Plant Census. In 2012, Dean Nicolle described subspecies kynoura and the name has been accepted by the Australian Plant Census. It differs mainly in having strongly ribbed fruit. The specific epithet goniantha is from the Greek gonio-, angled and anthos, flower, referring to the ribbed flower buds and fruit. The epithet kynoura is from the Greek kynouron meaning "sea-cliff", referring to the habitat of the subspecies.

== Distribution and habitat ==
Both subspecies of E. goniantha grow in exposed coastal and near-coastal places in thin sandy soil, usually over limestone. Subspecies goniantha is found between Mutton Bird Island and the Flinders Peninsula near Albany, and as far inland as Manypeaks where it intergrades with E. ecostata. Subspecies kynoura is only found at Point Hillier near Denmark.

== Conservation status ==
Subspecies goniantha is classified as "not threatened" but subspecies kynoura is classified as "Priority Two" by the Western Australian Government Department of Parks and Wildlife meaning that it is poorly known and from only one or a few locations.

== See also ==
- List of Eucalyptus species
