= Eucalyptus opimiflora =

Northern silver mallee

Scientific classification
- Kingdom: Plantae
- Clade: Tracheophytes
- Clade: Angiosperms
- Clade: Eudicots
- Clade: Rosids
- Order: Myrtales
- Family: Myrtaceae
- Genus: Eucalyptus
- Species: E. opimiflora

Binomial name
- Eucalyptus opimiflora Nicolle & M.E.French

Species of eucalyptus

Eucalyptus opimiflora, commonly known as northern silver mallee, is a species of mallee that is endemic to near-coastal areas of Western Australia between Perth and Geraldton. It has smooth grey bark, lance-shaped adult leaves, flower buds in groups of between seven and fifteen, creamy white flowers and conical to hemispherical fruit.

== Description ==
Eucalyptus opimiflora is a mallee that grows to a height of 7 m (23 ft) and forms a lignotuber. The bark is smooth grey and cream-coloured. The leaves on young plants and on coppice regrowth are dull green to slightly bluish, elliptical, up to 35 mm (1.4 in) long and 25 mm (0.98 in) wide. Adult leaves are lance-shaped, mostly 60–110 mm (2.4–4.3 in) long and 15–25 mm (0.59–0.98 in) wide. The flower buds are borne in groups of between seven and fifteen on a slightly flattened peduncle 8–14 mm (0.31–0.55 in) long, the individual flowers on pedicels 2–5 mm (0.079–0.197 in) long. Mature buds are cream-coloured, 5–8 mm (0.20–0.31 in) wide with a conical operculum up to 2.2 times as long as the floral cup. The flowers are creamy white and the fruit are conical to hemispherical, 5–7 mm (0.20–0.28 in) long and 7–11 mm (0.28–0.43 in) wide.

== Taxonomy and naming ==
Eucalyptus opimiflora was first formally described in 2012 by Dean Nicolle and Malcolm E. French from a specimen they collected near Badgingarra in 2000. The description was published in the journal Nuytsia. The specific epithet (opimiflora) is from Latin, meaning "rich" or "fruitful" (in the sense of fat) and "-flowered".

== Distribution and habitat ==
This mallee usually grows on laterite slopes, often in low heath and occurs in near-coastal areas from south of Geraldton to near Cunderdin, in the Avon Wheatbelt, Geraldton Sandplains and Swan Coastal Plain biogeographic regions.

== Conservation status ==
Eucalyptus opimiflora is classified as "not threatened" by the Western Australian Government Department of Parks and Wildlife.

== See also ==
- List of Eucalyptus species
