= Eucalyptus paludicola =

Mount Compass swamp gum

Conservation status
- Endangered (EPBC Act)

Scientific classification
- Kingdom: Plantae
- Clade: Embryophytes
- Clade: Tracheophytes
- Clade: Spermatophytes
- Clade: Angiosperms
- Clade: Eudicots
- Clade: Rosids
- Order: Myrtales
- Family: Myrtaceae
- Genus: Eucalyptus
- Species: E. paludicola

Binomial name
- Eucalyptus paludicola D.Nicolle

Species of eucalyptus

Eucalyptus paludicola, commonly known as Mount Compass swamp gum, marsh gum or Fleurieu swamp gum, is a species of small tree that is endemic to the south-east of South Australia. It has smooth bark, lance-shaped or curved adult leaves, flower buds usually in groups of seven, creamy white flowers, and cylindrical, conical or bell-shaped fruit. It is only known from the Fleurieu Peninsula and Kangaroo Island.

== Description ==
Eucalyptus paludicola is a tree that typically grows to a height of 12 m (39 ft) or a mallee to 5 m (16 ft), and forms a lignotuber. Young plants and coppice regrowth have dull green, egg-shaped leaves that are 40–100 mm (1.6–3.9 in) long and 28–70 mm (1.1–2.8 in) wide. Adult leaves are lance-shaped to curved, the same shade of green on both sides, 80–210 mm (3.1–8.3 in) long and 20–40 mm (0.79–1.57 in) wide, tapering to a petiole 10–25 mm (0.39–0.98 in) long. The flower buds are arranged in leaf axils, usually in groups of seven, sometimes three, on an unbranched peduncle, 5–15 mm (0.20–0.59 in) long, the individual buds on pedicels 1–5 mm (0.039–0.197 in) long. Mature buds are club-shaped, 10–13 mm (0.39–0.51 in) long and 7–9 mm (0.28–0.35 in) wide with a conical, rounded or beaked operculum. Flowering mainly occurs in spring and the flowers are creamy white. The fruit is a woody, cylindrical, conical or bell-shaped capsule 8–13 mm (0.31–0.51 in) long and 9–15 mm (0.35–0.59 in) wide with the valves near rim level or protruding slightly.

== Taxonomy ==
Eucalyptus paludicola was first formally described in 1995 by Dean Nicolle in the Journal of the Adelaide Botanic Garden, from material he collected from near Mount Compass in 1992. The specific epithet (paludicola) is from Latin, meaning "swamp-dwelling", referring to the habitat of this eucalypt.

== Distribution and habitat ==
Mount Compass swamp gum grows in seasonally swampy places, sometimes in pure stands, mainly on the eastern and southern sides of the Mount Lofty Ranges. A few individuals have been recorded on Kangaroo Island. It is sometimes confused with swamp gum, E. ovata subsp. ovata which grows in similar habitats but has thinner, glossy green adult leaves, smaller buds and consistently conical fruit.

== Conservation status ==
This eucalypt is listed as "endangered" under the Australian Government Environment Protection and Biodiversity Conservation Act 1999 and as "vulnerable" under the Government of South Australian National Parks and Wildlife Act 1972. The main threats to the species are swamp drainage, land clearing, road works and weed invasion. A project has been undertaken to enhance the viability of the species and to increase the total number of individuals in the wild from the roughly 600 plants in 2012.

== Use in horticulture ==
Mount Compass swamp gum flowers prolifically and although not known is cultivation, is suitable for growing in waterlogged sites, would attract nectar-feeding birds and would be useful for shelter and shade.

== See also ==
- List of Eucalyptus species
