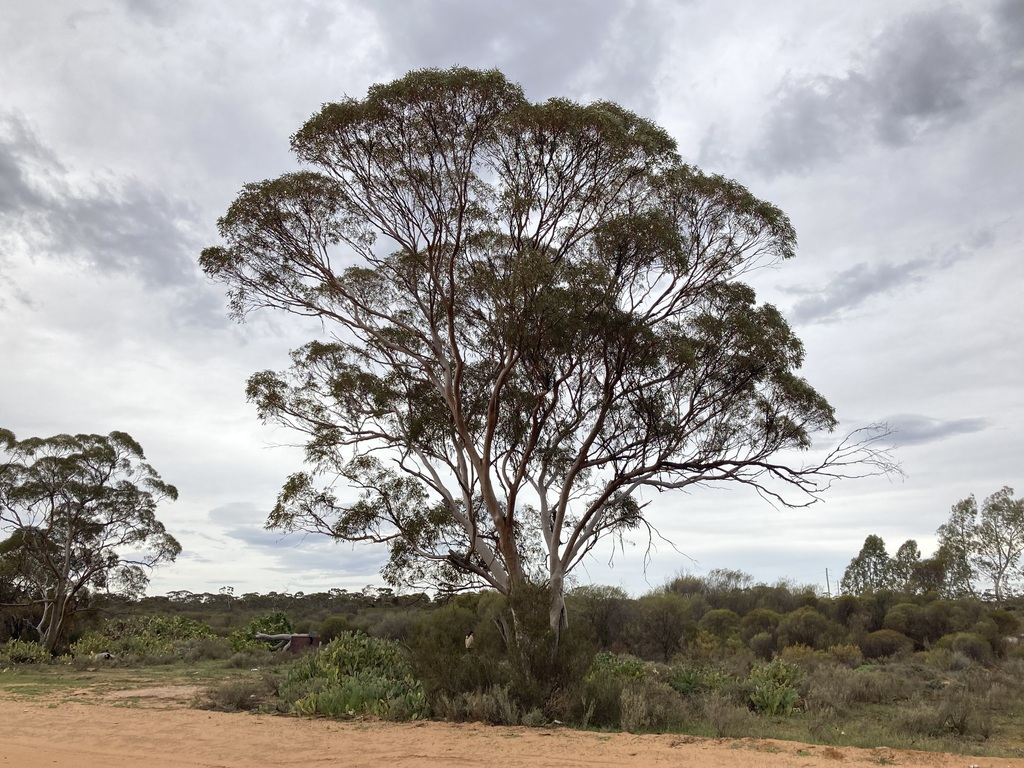
- Near Yellowdine Nature Reserve

Scientific classification
- Kingdom: Plantae
- Clade: Embryophytes
- Clade: Tracheophytes
- Clade: Angiosperms
- Clade: Eudicots
- Clade: Rosids
- Order: Myrtales
- Family: Myrtaceae
- Genus: Eucalyptus
- Species: E. vittata

Binomial name
- Eucalyptus vittata D.Nicolle

= Eucalyptus vittata =

Species of eucalyptus

Eucalyptus vittata is a species of mallet that is endemic to Western Australia. It has smooth bark, lance-shaped adult leaves, ribbed flower buds in groups of seven or nine, creamy white flowers and glaucous, hemispherical to cylindrical or cup-shaped fruit.

== Description ==
Eucalyptus vittata is a mallet that typically grows to a height of 6–14 m (20–46 ft) but does not form a lignotuber. It has smooth grey and creamy white bark that is shed in long ribbons. The adult leaves are lance-shaped, the same shade of dull green to bluish on both sides, 70–150 mm (2.8–5.9 in) long and 7–23 mm (0.28–0.91 in) wide, tapering to a petiole 11–25 mm (0.43–0.98 in) long. The flower buds are arranged in leaf axils in groups of seven or nine on an unbranched peduncle 5–13 mm (0.20–0.51 in) long, the individual buds on pedicels 1–6 mm (0.039–0.236 in) long. Mature buds are oval to pear-shaped, 7–10 mm (0.28–0.39 in) long and 4–6 mm (0.16–0.24 in) wide, with a conical operculum that is often faintly ribbed. The flowers are creamy white and the fruit is a woody, glaucous, hemispherical to cylindrical or cup-shaped capsule 5–7 mm (0.20–0.28 in) long and 5–8 mm (0.20–0.31 in) wide with the valves near rim level.

== Taxonomy and naming ==
Eucalyptus vittata was first formally described in 2009 by Dean Nicolle from a specimen he collected with Malcolm French on the road between Hyden and Norseman in 2001, and the description was published in the journal Nuytsia. The specific epithet (vittata) is from the Latin vittatus meaning "bound with a ribbon", referring to the long ribbons of bark hanging in the crown.

== Distribution and habitat ==
This mallet grows on flats around dry salt lakes and clay pans or below breakaways, sometimes in pure stands near the north-eastern margin of the wheatbelt in the Avon Wheatbelt, Coolgardie, Mallee and Yalgoo biogeographic regions.

== Conservation status ==
Eucalyptus vittata is classified as "not threatened" by the Government of Western Australia Department of Parks and Wildlife.

== See also ==
- List of Eucalyptus species
