= Eucalyptus rhomboidea =

Diamond gum

Conservation status
- Endangered (IUCN 3.1)

- Priority Four — Rare Taxa (DEC)

Scientific classification
- Kingdom: Plantae
- Clade: Tracheophytes
- Clade: Angiosperms
- Clade: Eudicots
- Clade: Rosids
- Order: Myrtales
- Family: Myrtaceae
- Genus: Eucalyptus
- Species: E. rhomboidea

Binomial name
- Eucalyptus rhomboidea Hopper & D.Nicolle

Species of eucalyptus

Eucalyptus rhomboidea, commonly known as the diamond gum, is a species of mallet or tree that is endemic to the southwest of Western Australia. It has smooth bark, lance-shaped adult leaves, flower buds in groups of seven, pale yellow flowers and cup-shaped to funnel-shaped fruit that is glaucous at first.

== Description ==
Eucalyptus rhomboidea is a mallet that typically grows to a height of 18 m (59 ft) but does not form a lignotuber. It has smooth greyish to brownish bark that is shed in ribbons. Young plants have stems that are square in cross-section and egg-shaped to elliptical leaves that are sessile, glaucous and arranged in opposite pairs. Adult leaves are lance-shaped, the same shade of green on both sides, 80–155 mm (3.1–6.1 in) long and 15–35 mm (0.59–1.38 in) wide, tapering to a petiole 20–30 mm (0.79–1.18 in) long. The flower buds are arranged in leaf axils in groups of seven on an erect, unbranched peduncle 7–13 mm (0.28–0.51 in) long, the individual buds on pedicels 1–4 mm (0.039–0.157 in) long. Mature buds are oval to rhomboid, about 12 mm (0.47 in) long and 6 mm (0.24 in) wide with a conical to slightly beaked operculum. Flowering occurs from September to October and the flowers are pale yellow. The fruit is a woody, cup-shaped to funnel-shaped capsule, glaucous at first and with the valves protruding strongly.

== Taxonomy and naming ==
Eucalyptus rhomboidea was first formally described in 2007 by Stephen Hopper and Dean Nicolle in the journal Nuytsia from material collected by Nicolle in 1998. The specific epithet (rhomboidea) is from the Latin word rhombus meaning "diamond-shaped", referring to the distinctively shaped flower buds.

== Distribution and habitat ==
Diamond gum is only known from level or slightly undulating country in the Bremer Range between Lake King and Norseman where it grows in low woodland or tall shrubland.

== Conservation status ==
This eucalypt is classified as "Priority Four" by the Government of Western Australia Department of Parks and Wildlife, meaning that is rare or near threatened. The IUCN Red List assesses the species as endangered.

== See also ==
- List of Eucalyptus species
