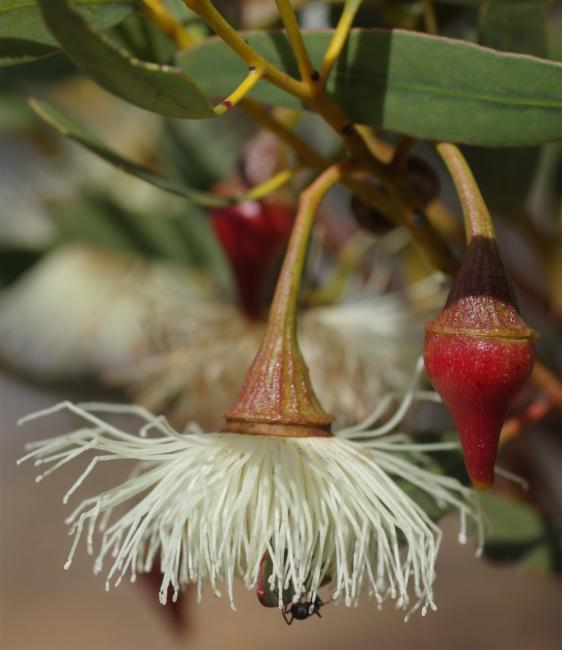
- Eucalyptus armillata flowers (pale creamy yellow form)

Conservation status
- Vulnerable (IUCN 3.1)

Scientific classification
- Kingdom: Plantae
- Clade: Tracheophytes
- Clade: Angiosperms
- Clade: Eudicots
- Clade: Rosids
- Order: Myrtales
- Family: Myrtaceae
- Genus: Eucalyptus
- Species: E. armillata

Binomial name
- Eucalyptus armillata Nicolle & M.E.French

Synonyms
- Eucalyptus conoidea var. marginata Benth.; Eucalyptus erythronema var. marginata (Benth.) Domin

= Eucalyptus armillata =

Red-flowered mallee

Species of eucalyptus

Eucalyptus armillata, commonly known as red-flowered mallee or flanged mallee, is a mallee that is endemic to the south-west of Western Australia. It has smooth bark, narrow lance-shaped adult leaves, flower buds hanging downwards in groups of three, usually red flowers and prominently ribbed fruit with a double flange around the rim.

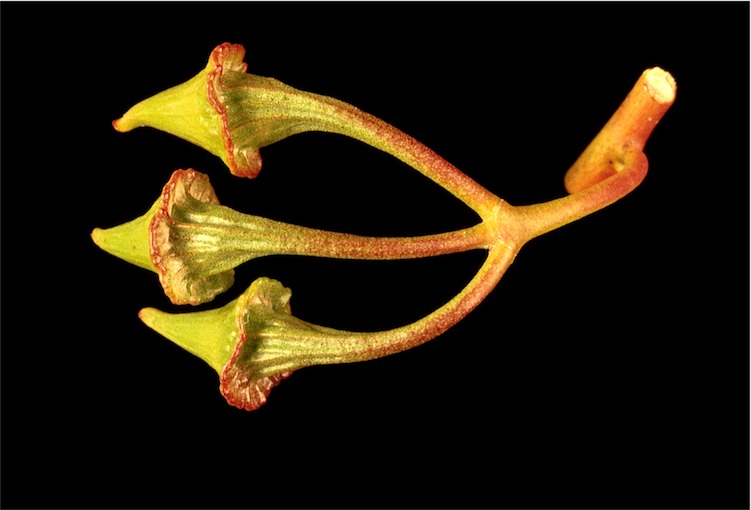
flower buds

== Description ==
Eucalyptus armillata is a mallee that grows to a height of about 7 metres (23 ft) and forms a lignotuber. The bark is pale grey to white turning pink to reddish purple and smooth over the length of the tree. The leaves on young plants and on coppice regrowth are dull green and narrow lance-shaped. The adult leaves are narrow lance-shaped, glossy, 55–110 mm (2–4 in) long and 7–14 mm (0.3–0.6 in) wide. The flower buds droop downwards, mostly in groups of three on a thickened peduncle 13–31 mm (0.5–1.2 in) long, the individual flowers on a pedicel up to 40 mm (1.6 in) long. The mature buds are shaped like two cones joined at the base, 18–23 mm (0.7–0.9 in) long and 7–11 mm (0.3–0.4 in) wide with a prominent flange below the operculum. The flowers are usually red, occasionally pale creamy yellow, and the fruit are shaped like the flower buds, 10–14 mm (0.4–0.6 in) long and 7–12 mm (0.3–0.5 in) wide with ribs on the side and a double flange around the rim.

== Taxonomy and naming ==
Eucalyptus armillata was first formally described in 2012 by Dean Nicolle and Malcolm E. French from a specimen collected south of Wongan Hills. The description was published in the journal Nuytsia. The specific epithet (armillata) is a Latin word meaning "ornamented with a bracelet", referring to the prominent flange at the top of the floral cup and around the rim of the fruit.

== Distribution and habitat ==
The red-flowered mallee grows in mallee vegetation, usually on level ground from near Corrow and Calingiri to near Beacon and Wubin in the Avon Wheatbelt, Geraldton Sandplains, Jarrah Forest and Mallee biogeographic regions.

== Conservation ==
Eucalyptus armillata is classified as "not threatened" by the Western Australian Government Department of Parks and Wildlife.

== See also ==
- List of Eucalyptus species
