= Eucalyptus aridimontana =

Conservation status
- Least Concern (IUCN 3.1)

Scientific classification
- Kingdom: Plantae
- Clade: Tracheophytes
- Clade: Angiosperms
- Clade: Eudicots
- Clade: Rosids
- Order: Myrtales
- Family: Myrtaceae
- Genus: Eucalyptus
- Species: E. aridimontana

Binomial name
- Eucalyptus aridimontana Nicolle & M.E.French

Species of eucalyptus

Eucalyptus aridimontana is a mallee that is endemic to a small area in the Pilbara region of Western Australia. It has smooth bark, lance-shaped adult leaves, flower buds in groups of seven or nine, white flowers and barrel-shaped fruit.

== Description ==
Eucalyptus aridimontana is a mallee that grows to a height of 4–6 metres (13–20 ft) and forms a lignotuber. The bark is grey and cream-coloured and smooth over the length of the tree. The leaves on young plants and on coppice regrowth are dull green to bluish, lance-shaped and up to 55 mm (2 in) long and 22 mm (0.9 in) wide. The adult leaves are lance-shaped, mostly 70–145 mm (3–6 in) long and 10–26 mm (0.4–1 in) wide. The flower buds are borne in groups of seven or nine on the ends of the branches and in leaf axils on a thickened peduncle 6–16 mm (0.2–0.6 in) long, the individual flowers on a pedicel 1–6 mm (0.0–0.2 in) long. The mature buds are club-shaped, 3–4 mm (0.1–0.2 in) wide with a conical operculum. The flowers are white and the fruit are barrel-shaped, 4.5–9 mm (0.2–0.4 in) long and 3.5–6 mm (0.1–0.2 in) wide.

== Taxonomy and naming ==
Eucalyptus aridimontana was first formally described in 2012 by Dean Nicolle and Malcolm E. French from a specimen collected near Tom Price. The description was published in the journal Nuytsia. The specific epithet (aridimontana) is derived from Latin words meaning "dry" and "montane", referring to the habitat of this species.

== Distribution and habitat ==
This mallee grows in skeletal soils on the slopes, ridges and summits of high mountains in the Hamersley Range of the Gascoyne and Pilbara biogeographic regions.

== Conservation ==
Eucalyptus aridimontana is classified as "not threatened" by the Western Australian Government Department of Parks and Wildlife.

== See also ==
- List of Eucalyptus species
