= Eucalyptus urna =

Merrit

Conservation status
- Near Threatened (IUCN 3.1)

Scientific classification
- Kingdom: Plantae
- Clade: Tracheophytes
- Clade: Angiosperms
- Clade: Eudicots
- Clade: Rosids
- Order: Myrtales
- Family: Myrtaceae
- Genus: Eucalyptus
- Species: E. urna

Binomial name
- Eucalyptus urna D.Nicolle

Species of eucalyptus

Eucalyptus urna, commonly known as merrit, is a species of mallet or marlock that is endemic to southern areas of Western Australia. It has smooth bark, lance-shaped adult leaves, flower buds in groups of seven to thirteen, creamy yellow to white flowers and urn-shaped fruit.

== Description ==
Eucalyptus urna is a mallet or marlock that typically grows to a height of 16 m (52 ft) but does not form a lignotuber. It has smooth grey to white, often glossy silvery bark. Young plants have stems that are square in cross-section with a prominent wing on each corner, and sessile, egg-shaped leaves that are bluish green, 20–95 mm (0.79–3.74 in) long and 13–40 mm (0.51–1.57 in) wide and arranged in opposite pairs. The flower buds are arranged in leaf axils on an unbranched peduncle 10–17 mm (0.39–0.67 in) long, the individual buds on pedicels 4–8 mm (0.16–0.31 in) long. Mature buds are 15–24 mm (0.59–0.94 in) long and 4–9 mm (0.16–0.35 in) wide with an urn-shaped floral cup and a beaked to horn-shaped operculum 9–16 mm (0.35–0.63 in) long. Flowering has been recorded in most months and the flowers are creamy yellow to white. The fruit is a woody, urn-shaped capsule 7–12 mm (0.28–0.47 in) long and 5–10 mm (0.20–0.39 in) wide with the valves protruding prominently but fragile.

== Taxonomy and naming ==
Eucalyptus urna was first formally described in 1999 by Dean Nicolle in Australian Systematic Botany from specimens collected by Ian Brooker near Newdegate in 1988. The specific epithet (urna) is a Latin word meaning water jar or urn, referring to the shape of the fruit.

== Distribution and habitat ==
This mallet is widespread and often locally abundant east and south-east of Perth and east of Lake Grace to Caiguna. It grows on flats in open woodland, often with an understorey of Melaleuca species.

== Conservation status ==
This eucalypt is classified as "not threatened" by the Western Australian Government Department of Parks and Wildlife. The IUCN Red List assesses the species as Near Threatened.

== See also ==
- List of Eucalyptus species
