= Eucalyptus rugulata =

Conservation status
- Endangered (IUCN 3.1)

- Priority Four — Rare Taxa (DEC)

Scientific classification
- Kingdom: Plantae
- Clade: Tracheophytes
- Clade: Angiosperms
- Clade: Eudicots
- Clade: Rosids
- Order: Myrtales
- Family: Myrtaceae
- Genus: Eucalyptus
- Species: E. rugulata

Binomial name
- Eucalyptus rugulata D.Nicolle

Species of eucalyptus

Eucalyptus rugulata, commonly known as the Ironcaps silver mallet, is a species of mallet or tree that is endemic to a restricted area of Western Australia. It has smooth bark, lance-shaped adult leaves, ribbed flower buds in groups of seven, creamy white flowers and shortened spherical fruit.

== Description ==
Eucalyptus rugulata is a mallet or tree that typically grows to a height of 12–15 m (39–49 ft) but does not form a lignotuber. It has smooth grey bark that is shed in strips. Adult leaves are the same dark, glossy green on both sides, lance-shaped, 75–110 mm (3.0–4.3 in) long and 13–23 mm (0.51–0.91 in) wide, tapering to a petiole 13–25 mm (0.51–0.98 in) long. The flower buds are arranged in leaf axils in groups of seven on an unbranched peduncle 10–31 mm (0.39–1.22 in) long, the individual buds on pedicels 7–14 mm (0.28–0.55 in) long. Mature buds are an elongated oval shape, 15–22 mm (0.59–0.87 in) long and 7–9 mm (0.28–0.35 in) wide with a ribbed floral cup and a smooth, conical operculum. Flowering has been recorded in November and the flowers are creamy white. The fruit is a woody, shortened spherical capsule with the valves protruding strongly but fragile.

== Taxonomy ==
Eucalyptus rugulata was first formally described in 2002 by Dean Nicolle in the journal Nuytsia from material collected east of Verley in 2000. The specific epithet (rugulata) is from the Latin word rugula meaning "wrinkle" or "corrugation", referring to the distinctly wrinkled dried fruit, but also the rugged habitat where this species grows.

== Distribution and habitat ==
This mallet grows on gravelly hills, often in more or less pure stands, between South Ironcap and Hatter Hill, east of Varley and north-east of Lake King.

== Conservation status ==
This eucalypt is classified as "Priority Four" by the Government of Western Australia Department of Parks and Wildlife, meaning that is rare or near threatened. The IUCN Red List assesses the species as endangered.

== See also ==
- List of Eucalyptus species
