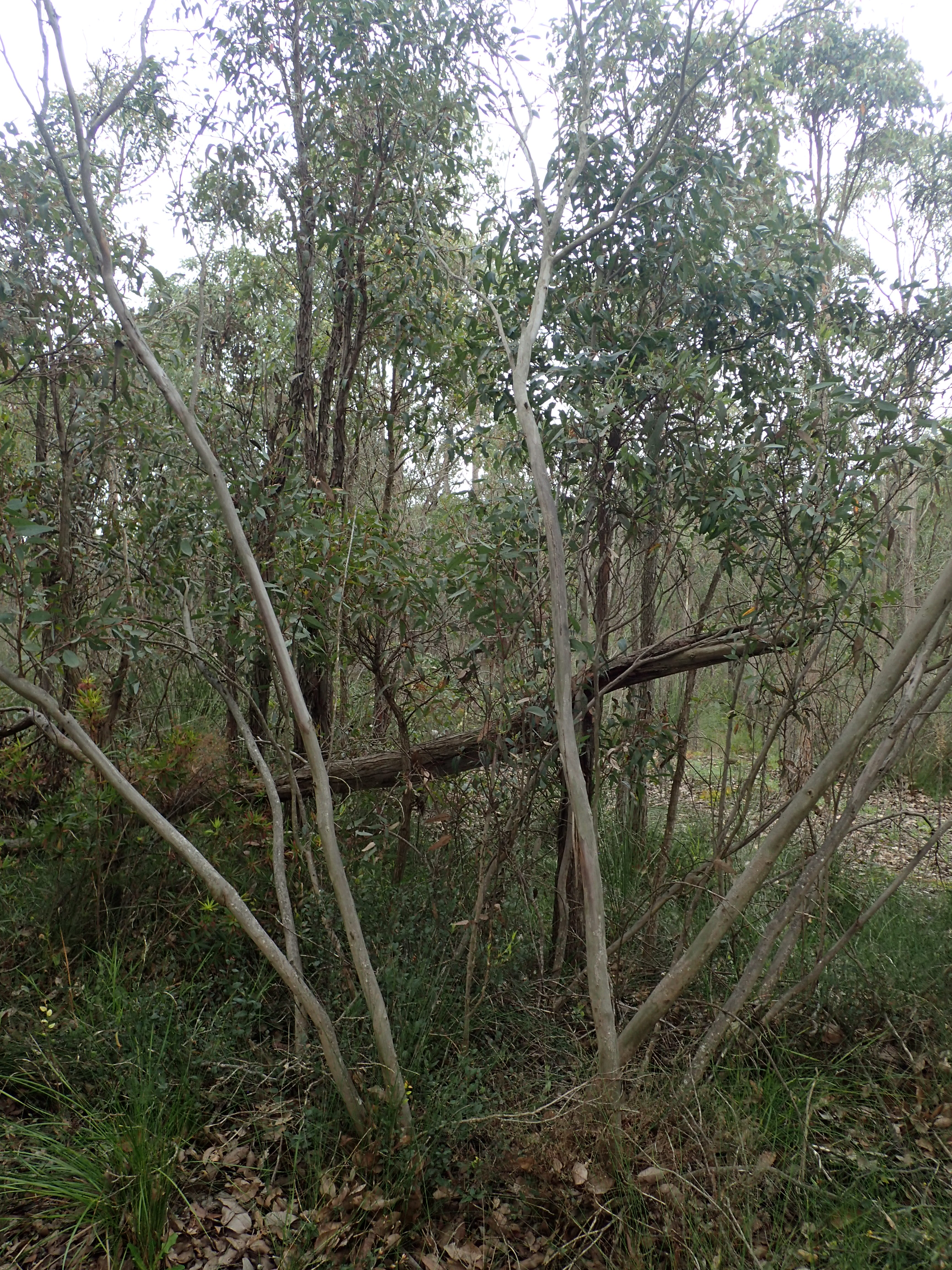
- Eucalyptus ecostata near Mount Barker

Conservation status
- Near Threatened (IUCN 3.1)

Scientific classification
- Kingdom: Plantae
- Clade: Tracheophytes
- Clade: Angiosperms
- Clade: Eudicots
- Clade: Rosids
- Order: Myrtales
- Family: Myrtaceae
- Genus: Eucalyptus
- Species: E. ecostata

Binomial name
- Eucalyptus ecostata (Maiden) D.Nicolle & M.E.French

Synonyms
- Eucalyptus falcata var. ecostata Maiden

= Eucalyptus ecostata =

Coastal silver mallee

Species of eucalyptus

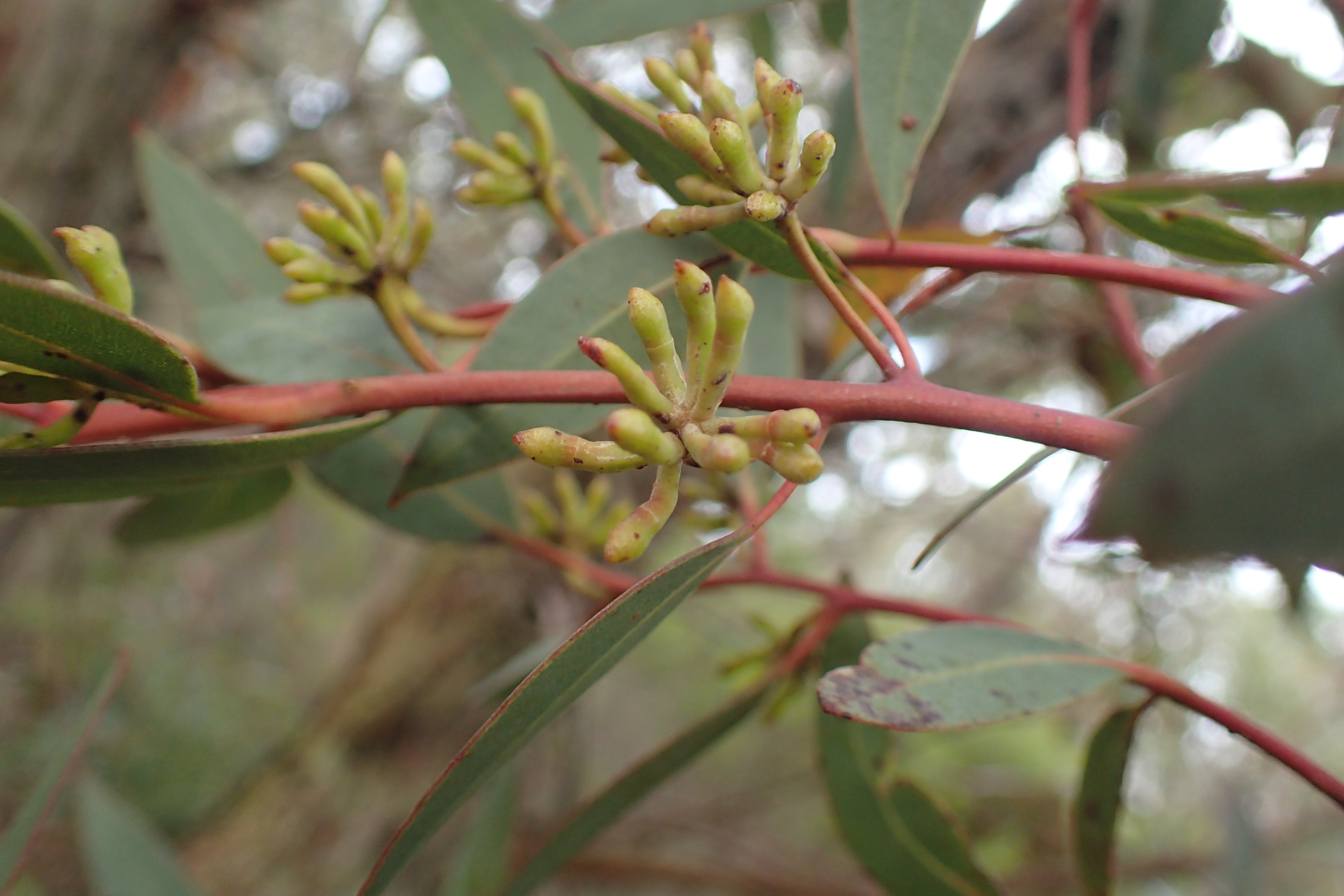
Flower buds

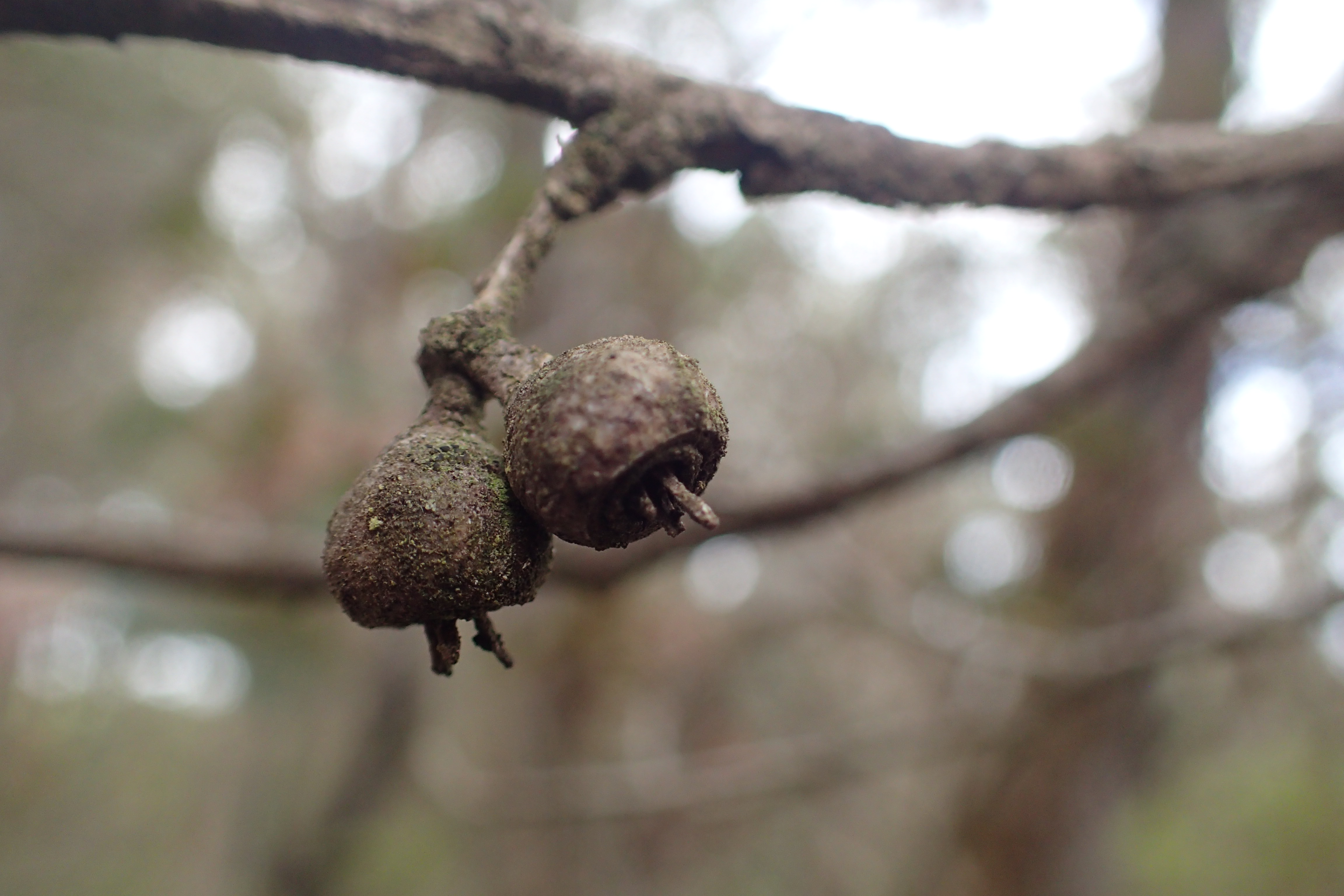
Fruit

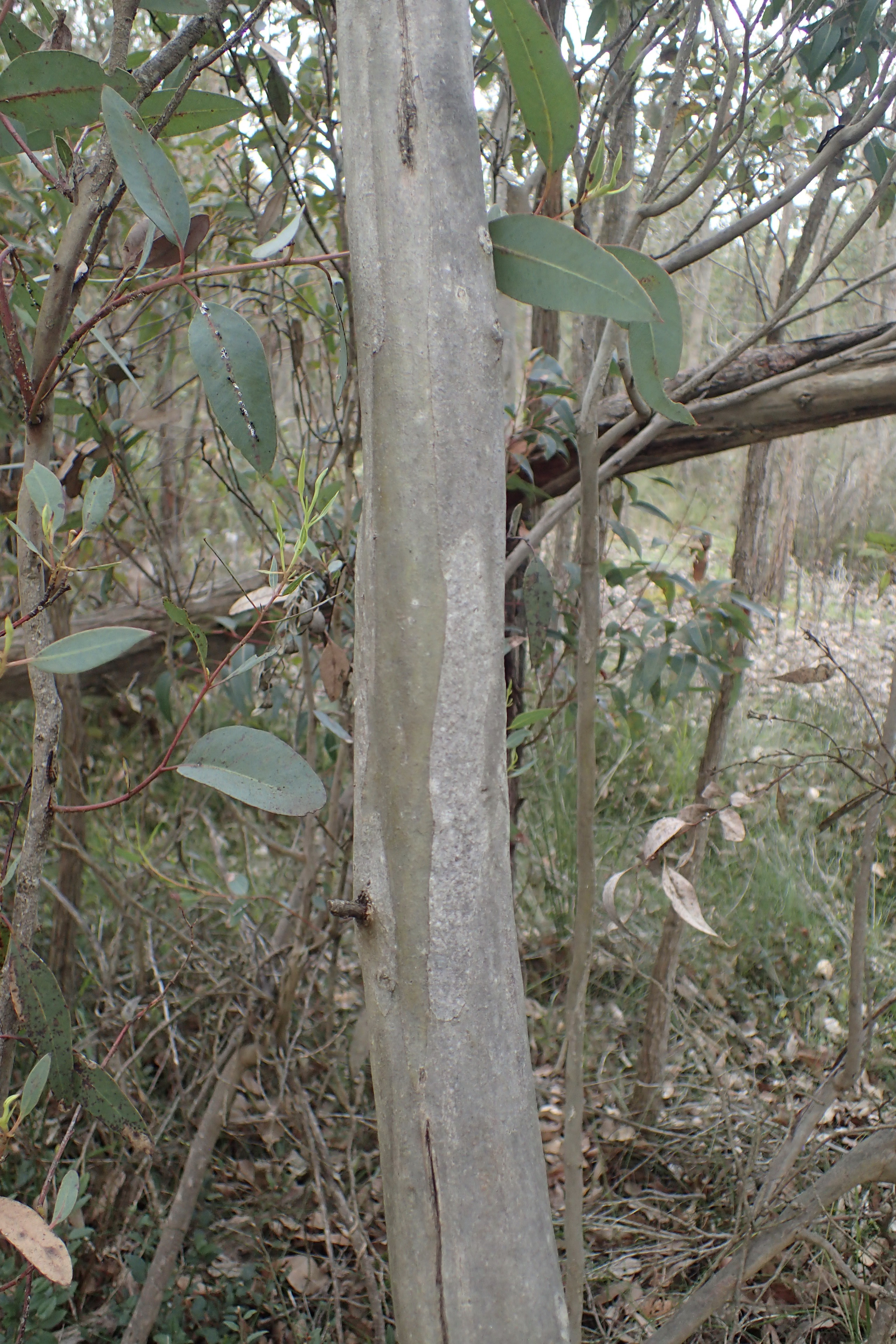
Bark

Eucalyptus ecostata, commonly known as coastal silver mallee, is a species of mallee that is endemic to the south coast of Western Australia. It has smooth greyish bark, lance-shaped to curved adult leaves, flower buds in groups of between eleven and fifteen, creamy white flowers and more or less hemispherical but flattened fruit.

== Description ==
Eucalyptus ecostata is a mallee that typically grows to a height of 6 m (20 ft) and forms a lignotuber. Young plants and coppice regrowth have elliptical, dull green leaves that are up to 30 mm (1.2 in) long and 20 mm (0.79 in) wide. Adult leaves are narrow lance-shaped to lance-shaped, glossy dark green, 70–110 mm (2.8–4.3 in) long and 13–17 mm (0.51–0.67 in) wide. The flower buds are arranged in groups of between eleven and fifteen on a pendulous peduncle 10–15 mm (0.39–0.59 in) long, the individual buds on a pedicel 5–8 mm (0.20–0.31 in) long. Mature buds are yellowish, 13–19 mm (0.51–0.75 in) long and 4–7 mm (0.16–0.28 in) wide with a long, conical operculum that is between two and five times as long as the floral cup. The flowers are creamy white and the fruit is a woody, flattened, more or less hemispherical capsule 6–12 mm (0.24–0.47 in) long and 7–12 mm (0.28–0.47 in) wide with the valves near the level of the rim or slightly beyond it.

== Taxonomy and naming ==
This eucalypt was first formally described in 1911 by Joseph Maiden who gave it the name Eucalyptus falcata var. ecostata and published the description in Journal and proceedings of the Natural History and Science Society of Western Australia. In 2012 Dean Nicolle and Malcolm French raised the variety to species status. The specific epithet (ecostata) means "without ribs".

== Distribution and habitat ==
This mallee grows in mallee shrubland in a variety of soils and in found in near-coastal areas of Western Australia between the Stirling Range and Stokes Inlet and as far inland as the Ravensthorpe Range, in the Esperance Plains, Jarrah Forest and Mallee biogeographic regions.

== Conservation status ==
Eucalyptus ecostatais classified as "not threatened" by the Western Australian Government Department of Parks and Wildlife. The IUCN Red List assesses the species as Near Threatened.
