= Dean Nicolle =

Australian botanist, arborist and ecologist

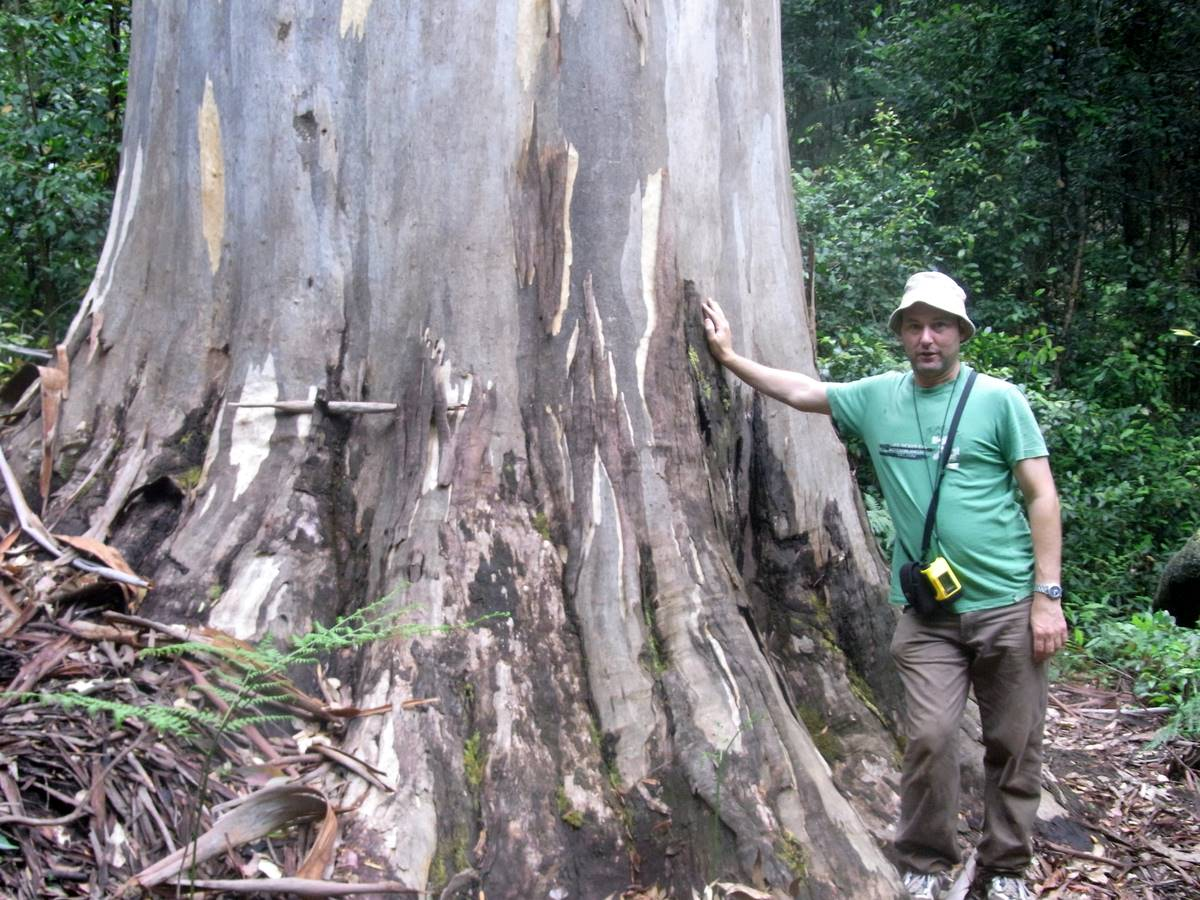
Dean Nicolle and Eucalyptus deanei

Dean Nicolle (born 1974), is an Australian botanist, arborist, and ecologist.

== Early life and education ==
Dean Nicolle was born in Adelaide, South Australia, in 1974.

He developed an interest in Eucalyptus trees as a young man. After completing a Bachelor of Science at the University of Adelaide, he went on to complete his PhD in 2008 on mallee trees at Flinders University.

== Career ==
Nicolle is a botanist, arborist, and ecologist.

Nicolle created the Currency Creek Arboretum, on a 30 hectares (74 acres) site in the Fleurieu region in South Australia.

As of 2017 he is the director and head of research at the arboretum. He has cultivated over 900 species and subspecies of Eucalyptus.

== Recognition ==
Nicolle was awarded the Centenary Medal in 2001 and the Medal of the Order of Australia in the 2018 Queen's Birthday Honours for "service to the conservation of Australian eucalypts".

In August 2025, the 4.4-kilometre (2.7 mi) Dean Nicolle Eucalypt Walk was opened along a section of the old railway corridor at Blyth, South Australia. The walk is the brainchild of artist Ian Roberts, who named it after Nicolle, following a long partnership whereby Roberts painted watercolours of eucalypts that he grew from seeds provided by Nicolle. As of September 2025, Roberts had painted around 770 of the 900 species of eucalypts. The trail features more than 2,000 Australian plant species, including 300 varieties of rare eucalypt, planted by volunteers between 2010 and 2019.
