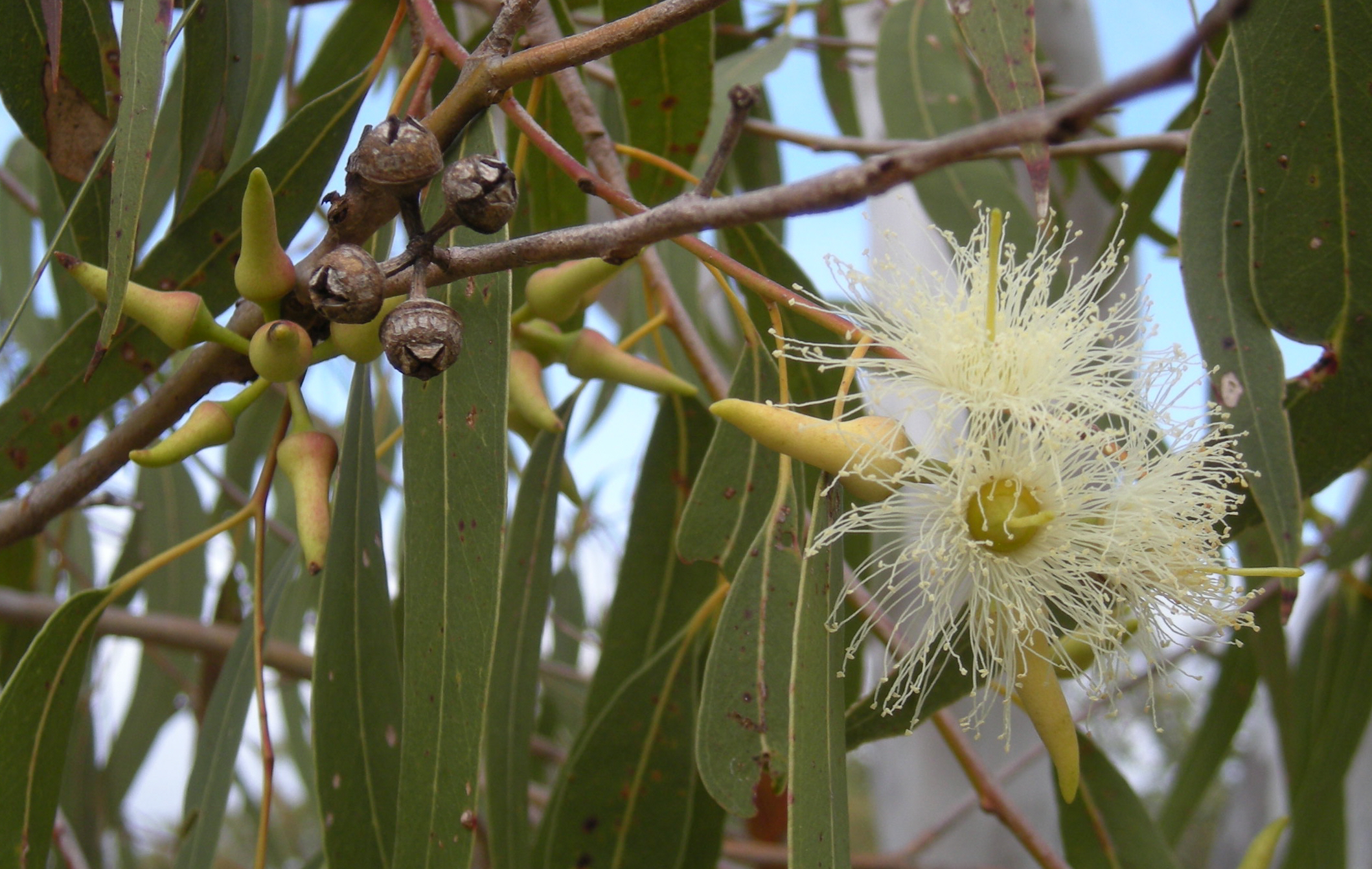
- Buds, capsules, flowers and foliage of E. tereticornis

Scientific classification
- Kingdom: Plantae
- Clade: Tracheophytes
- Clade: Angiosperms
- Clade: Eudicots
- Clade: Rosids
- Order: Myrtales
- Family: Myrtaceae
- Subfamily: Myrtoideae
- Tribe: Eucalypteae
- Genus: Eucalyptus; L'Hér.

Type species
- Eucalyptus obliqua L'Hér. 1789

Species
- List of Eucalyptus species
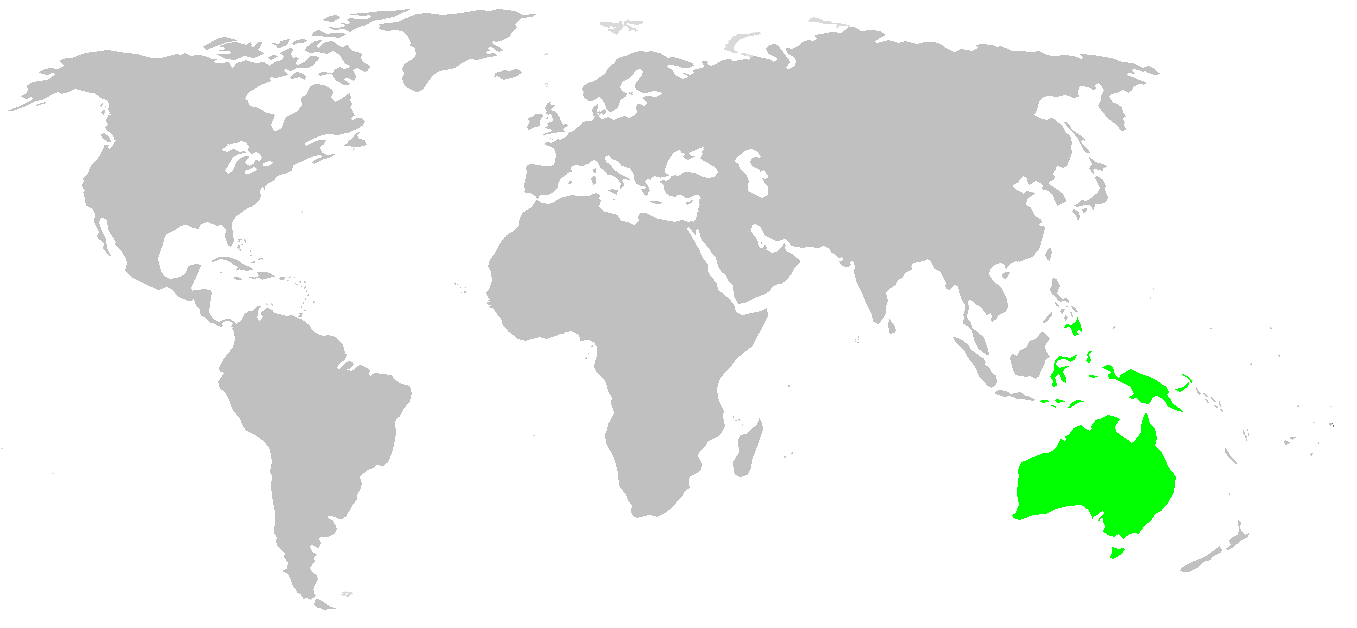
- Natural range

Synonyms
- Aromadendrum W.Anderson ex R.Br., 1810; Eudesmia R.Br., 1814; Symphyomyrtus Schauer in J.G.C.Lehmann, 1844

= Eucalyptus =

Eucalyptus Temporal range: Paleogene - recent Possible Maastrichtian record

Genus of flowering plants

Eucalyptus (/ˌjuːkəˈlɪptəs/) is a genus of more than 700 species of flowering plants in the family Myrtaceae. Most species of Eucalyptus are trees, often mallees, and a few are shrubs. Along with several other genera in the tribe Eucalypteae, including Corymbia and Angophora, they are commonly known as eucalypts or "gum trees". Species of Eucalyptus have bark that is either smooth, fibrous, hard, or stringy and leaves that have oil glands. The sepals and petals are fused to form a "cap" or operculum over the stamens, hence the name from Greek eû 'well' and kaluptós 'covered'.

Most species of Eucalyptus are native to Australia, and every state and territory has representative species. A few species are native to islands north of Australia, and a smaller number are only found outside the continent. Eucalypts have been grown in plantations in many other countries because they are fast-growing, have valuable timber, or can be used for pulpwood, honey production, or essential oils. In some countries, however, they have been removed because of the danger of forest fires due to their high flammability.

== Description ==
=== Size and habit ===
Eucalypts vary in size and habit from shrubs to tall trees. Trees usually have a single main stem or trunk but many eucalypts are mallees that are multistemmed from ground level and rarely taller than 10 metres (33 feet). There is no clear distinction between a mallee and a shrub but in eucalypts, a shrub is a mature plant less than 1 m (3 ft 3 in) tall and growing in an extreme environment. Eucalyptus vernicosa in the Tasmanian highlands, E. yalatensis on the Nullarbor and E. surgens growing on coastal cliffs in Western Australia are examples of eucalypt shrubs.

The terms "mallet" and "marlock" are only applied to Western Australian eucalypts. A mallet is a tree with a single thin trunk with a steeply branching habit but lacks both a lignotuber and epicormic buds. Eucalyptus astringens is an example of a mallet. A marlock is a shrub or small tree with a single, short trunk, that lacks a lignotuber and has spreading, densely leafy branches that often reach almost to the ground. Eucalyptus platypus is an example of a marlock.

Eucalyptus trees, including mallets and marlocks, are single-stemmed and include Eucalyptus regnans, the tallest known flowering plant on Earth. The tallest reliably measured tree in Europe, Karri Knight, can be found in Coimbra, Portugal in Vale de Canas. It is a Eucalyptus diversicolor of 72.9 meters height and of 5.71 meters girth.

Tree sizes follow the convention of:

- Small: to 10 m (33 ft) in height
- Medium-sized: 10–30 m (33–98 ft)
- Tall: 30–60 m (98–197 ft)
- Very tall: over 60 m (200 ft)
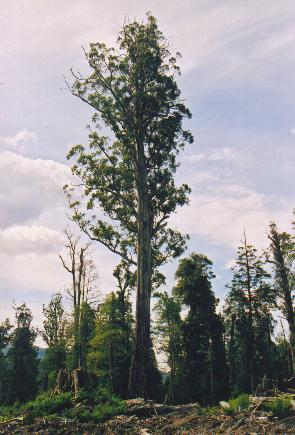
Eucalyptus regnans, a forest tree, showing crown dimension, Tasmania

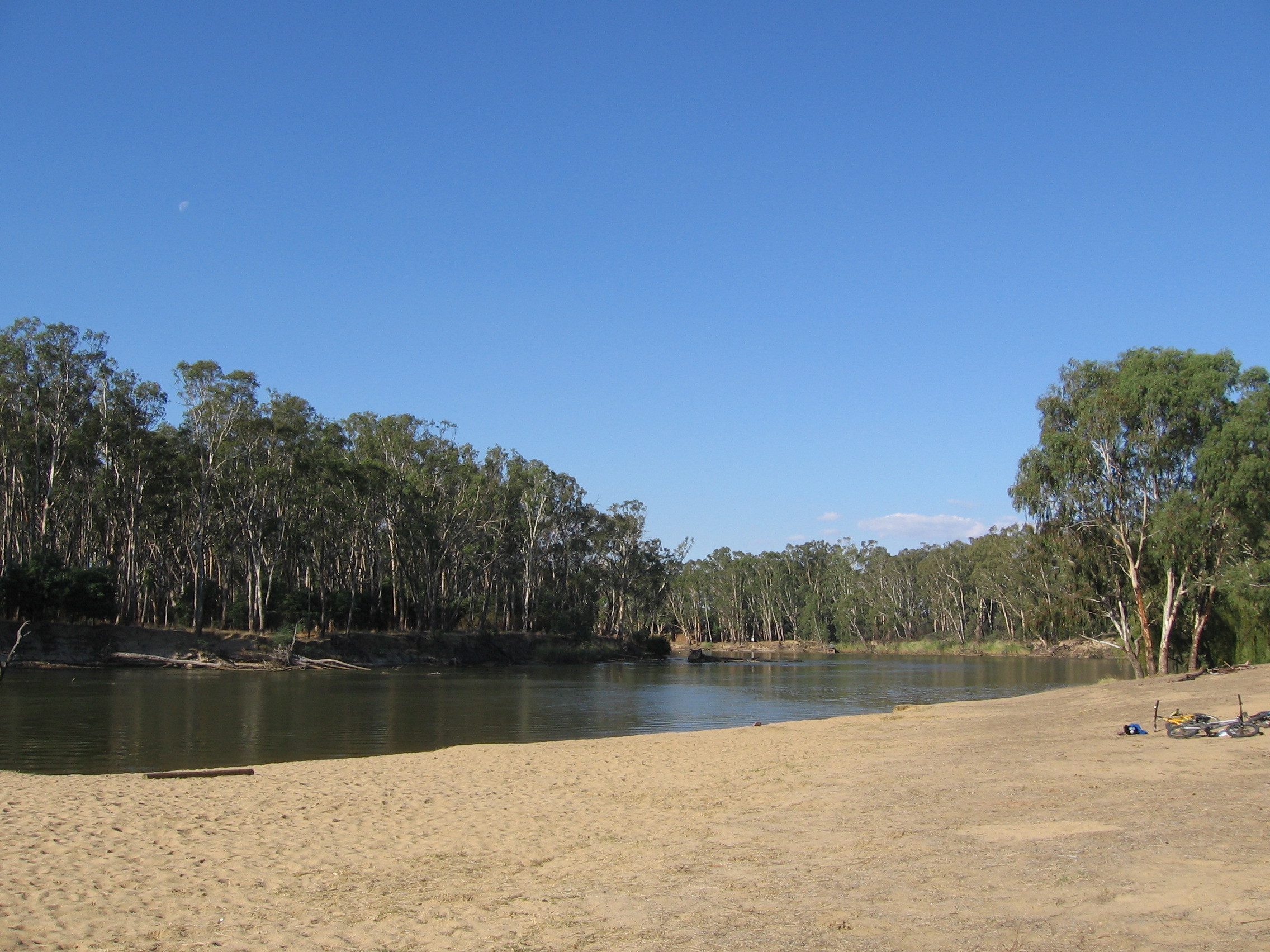
E. camaldulensis, immature woodland trees, showing collective crown habit, Murray River, Tocumwal, New South Wales

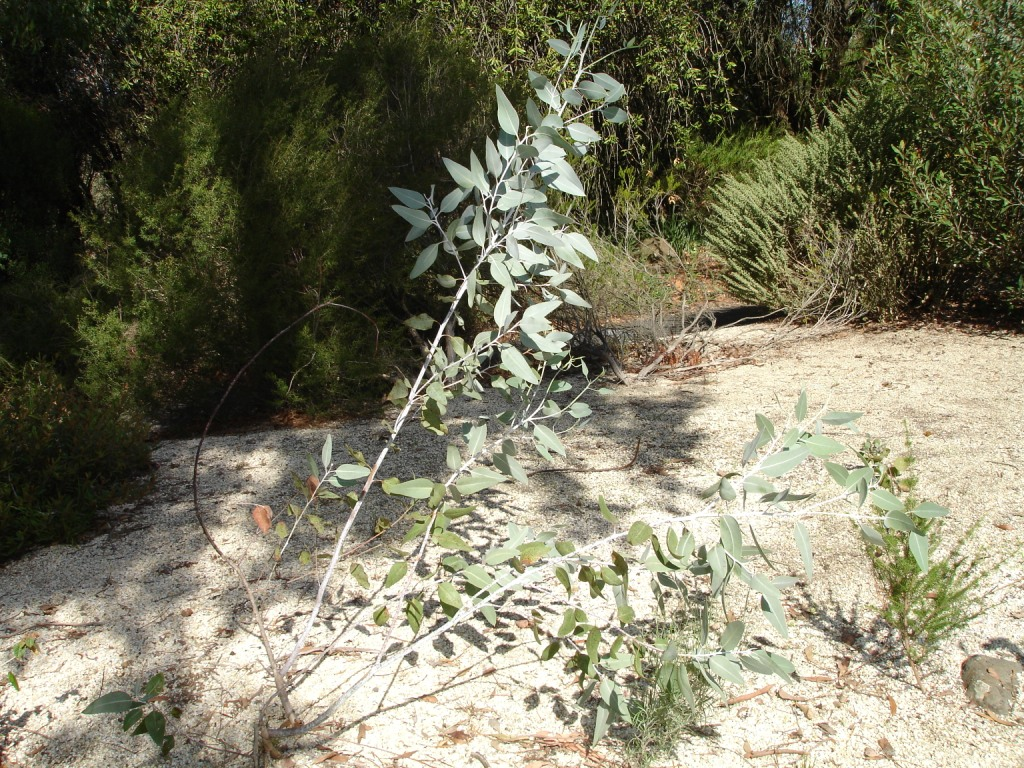
E. cretata, juvenile, showing low branching 'mallee' form, Melbourne, Victoria

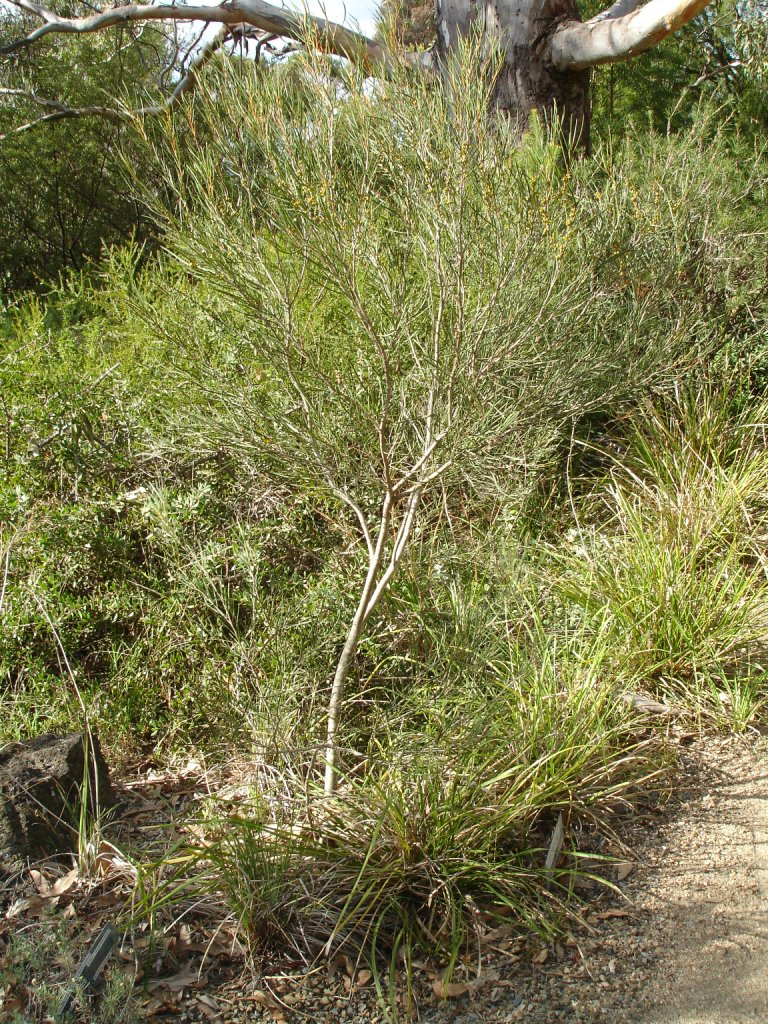
E. angustissima, showing shrub form, Melbourne

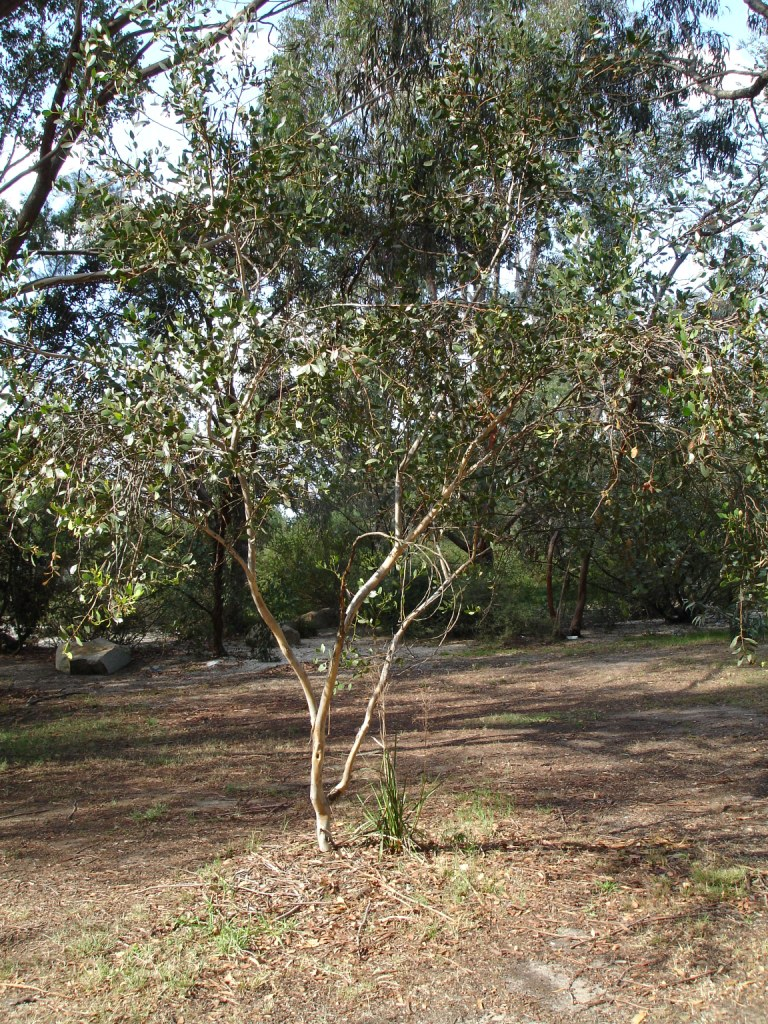
E. platypus, showing 'marlock' form, Melbourne

=== Bark ===
All eucalypts add a layer of bark every year and the outermost layer dies. In about half of the species, the dead bark is shed exposing a new layer of fresh, living bark. The dead bark may be shed in large slabs, in ribbons or in small flakes. These species are known as "smooth barks" and include E. sheathiana, E. diversicolor, E. cosmophylla and E. cladocalyx. The remaining species retain the dead bark which dries out and accumulates. In some of these species, the fibres in the bark are loosely intertwined (in stringybarks such as E. macrorhyncha or peppermints such as E. radiata) or more tightly adherent (as in the "boxes" such as E. leptophleba). In some species (the "ironbarks" such as E. crebra and E. jensenii) the rough bark is infused with gum resin.

Many species are 'half-barks' or 'blackbutts' in which the dead bark is retained in the lower half of the trunks or stems—for example, E. brachycalyx, E. ochrophloia, and E. occidentalis—or only in a thick, black accumulation at the base, as in E. clelandii. In some species in this category, for example E. youngiana and E. viminalis, the rough basal bark is very ribbony at the top, where it gives way to the smooth upper stems. The smooth upper bark of the half-barks and that of the completely smooth-barked trees and mallees can produce remarkable colour and interest, for example E. deglupta.

E. globulus bark cells are able to photosynthesize in the absence of foliage, conferring an "increased capacity to re-fix internal CO_{2} following partial defoliation". This allows the tree to grow in less-than-ideal climates, in addition to providing a better chance of recovery from damage sustained to its leaves in an event such as a fire.

Different commonly recognised types of bark include:

- Stringybark—consists of long fibres and can be pulled off in long pieces. It is usually thick with a spongy texture.
- Ironbark—is hard, rough, and deeply furrowed. It is impregnated with dried kino (a sap exuded by the tree) which gives a dark red or even black colour.
- Tessellated—bark is broken up into many distinct flakes. They are corkish and can flake off.
- Box—has short fibres. Some also show tessellation.
- Ribbon—has the bark coming off in long, thin pieces, but is still loosely attached in some places. They can be long ribbons, firmer strips, or twisted curls.
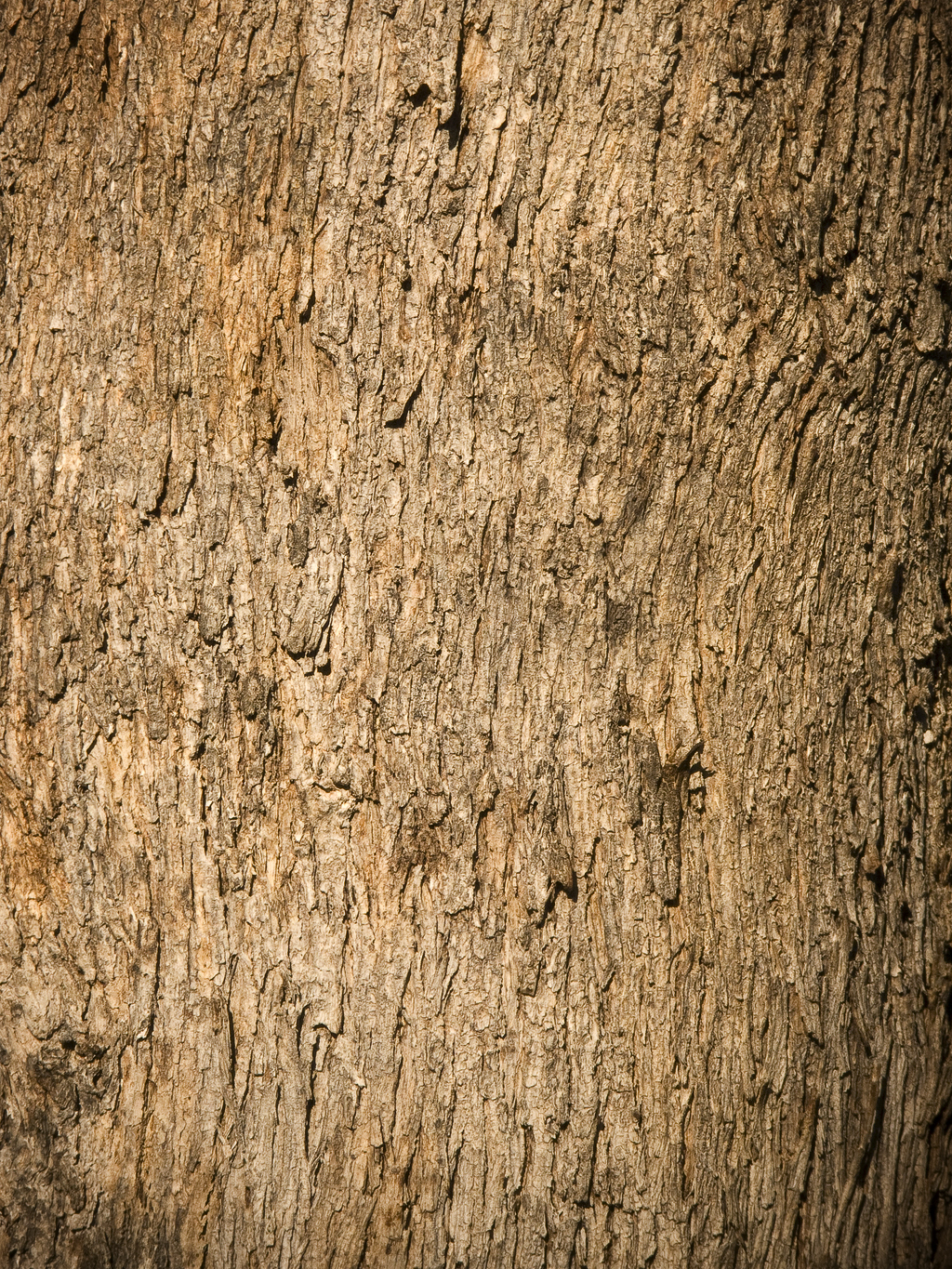
Bark detail of E. angophoroides, the apple-topped box

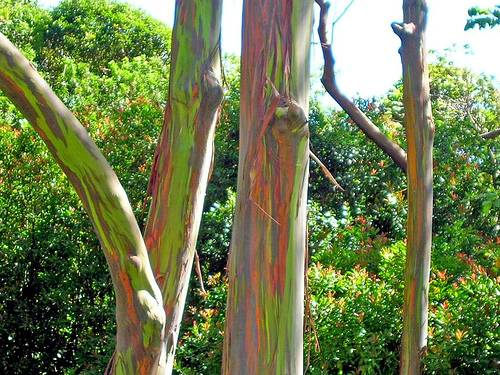
Coloured bark of E. deglupta native to Southeast Asia

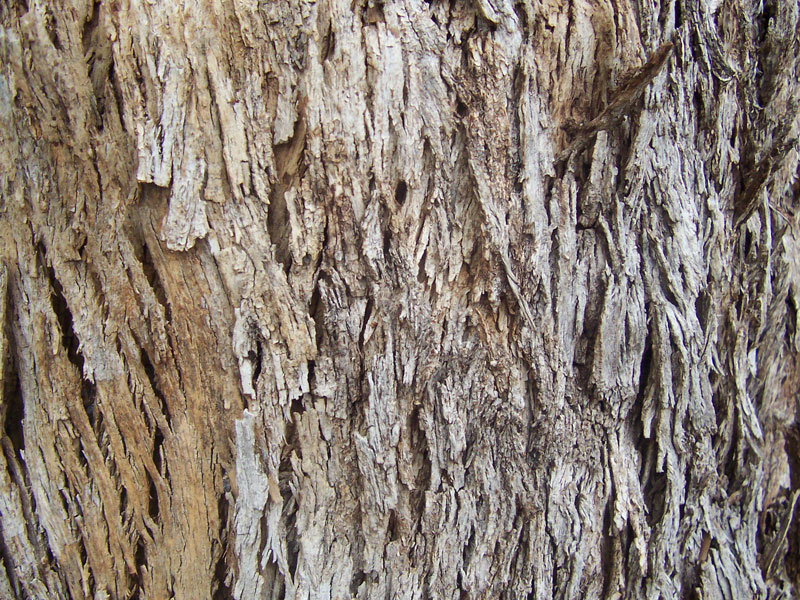
'Box' bark of E. quadrangulata, the white-topped box

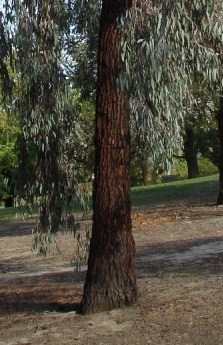
Dark, fissured 'ironbark' of E. sideroxylon

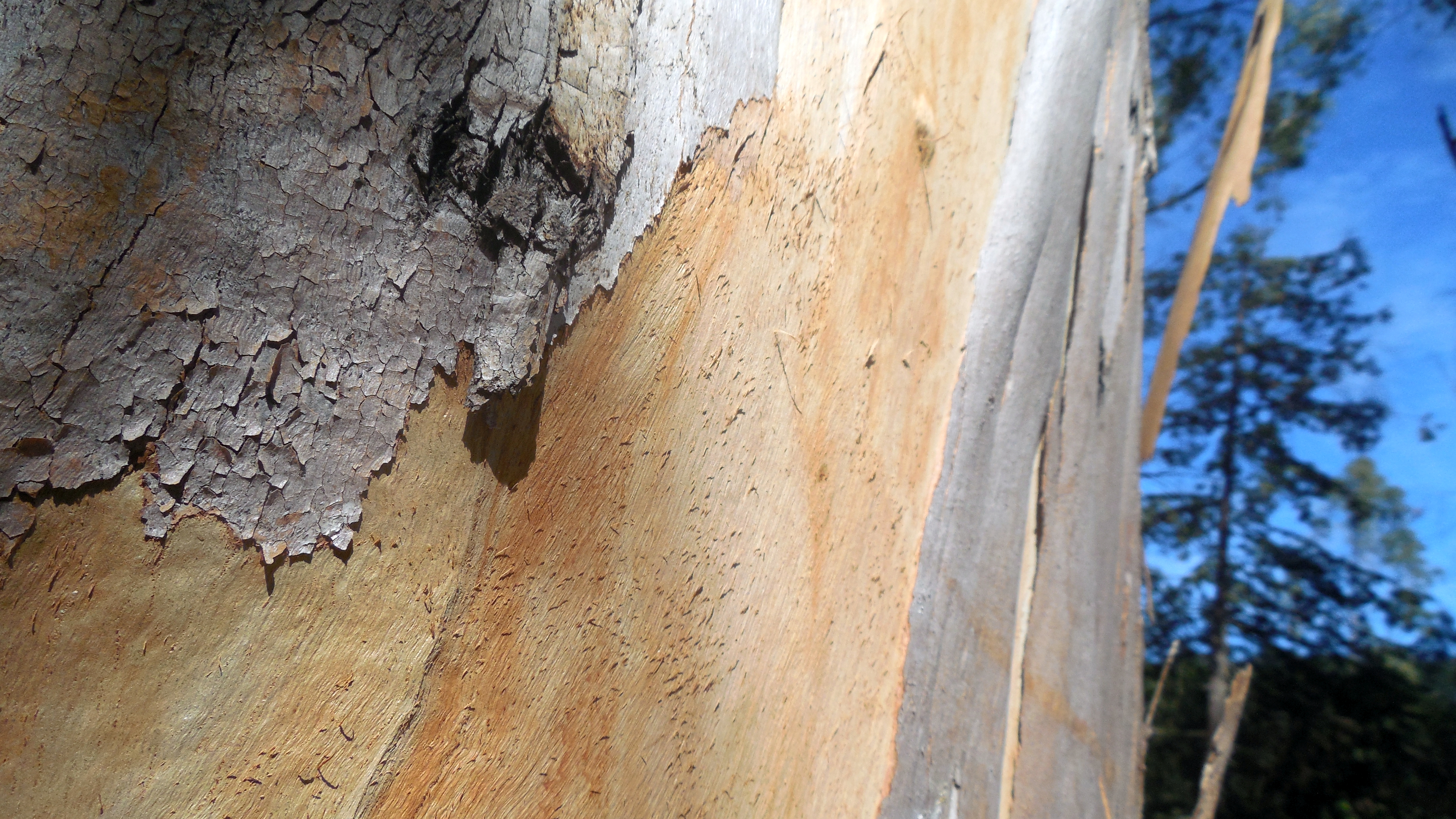
Shedding bark of E. globulus, Tasmanian blue gum

=== Leaves ===
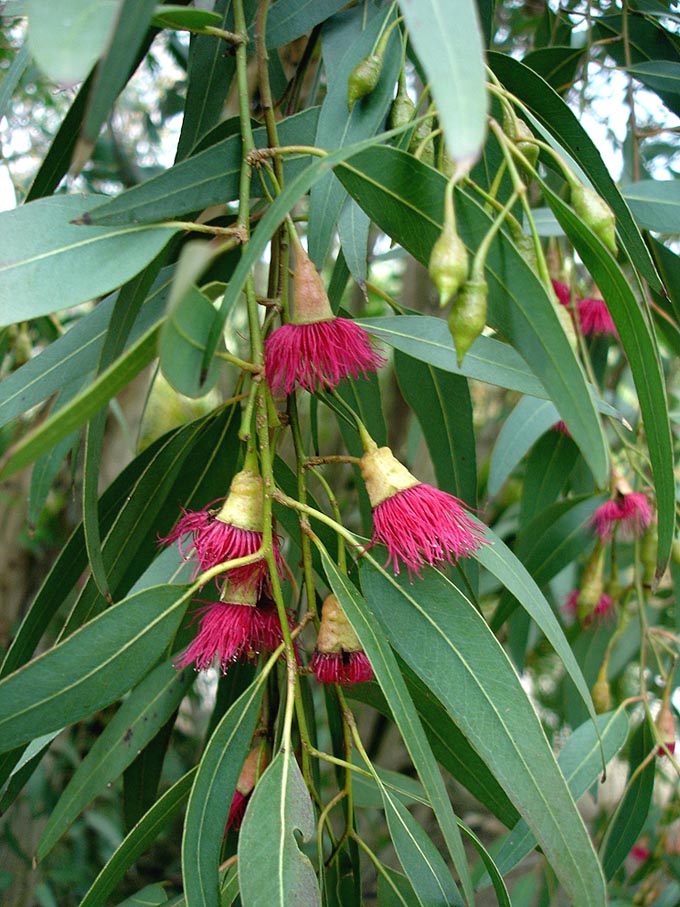
Eucalyptus leucoxylon var. 'Rosea' showing flowers and buds with operculum present

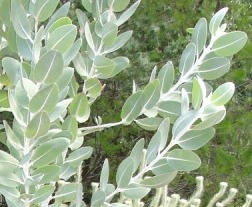
E. tetragona, showing glaucous leaves and stems

Nearly all eucalyptuses are evergreen, but some tropical species lose their leaves at the end of the dry season. As in other members of the myrtle family, eucalyptus leaves are covered with oil glands. The copious oils produced are an important feature of the genus. Although mature eucalyptus trees may be towering and fully leafed, their shade is characteristically patchy because the leaves usually hang downwards.

The leaves on a mature eucalyptus plant are commonly lanceolate, petiolate, apparently alternate and waxy or glossy green. In contrast, the leaves of seedlings are often opposite, sessile and glaucous. But many exceptions to this pattern exist. Many species such as E. melanophloia and E. setosa retain the juvenile leaf form even when the plant is reproductively mature. Some species, such as E. macrocarpa, E. rhodantha, and E. crucis, are sought-after ornamentals due to this lifelong juvenile leaf form. A few species, such as E. petraea, E. dundasii, and E. lansdowneana, have shiny green leaves throughout their life cycle. Eucalyptus caesia exhibits the opposite pattern of leaf development to most eucalyptuses, with shiny green leaves in the seedling stage and dull, glaucous leaves in mature crowns. The contrast between juvenile and adult leaf phases is valuable in field identification.

Four leaf phases are recognised in the development of a eucalyptus plant: the 'seedling', 'juvenile', 'intermediate', and 'adult' phases. However, no definite transitional point occurs between the phases. The intermediate phase, when the largest leaves are often formed, links the juvenile and adult phases.

In all except a few species, the leaves form in pairs on opposite sides of a square stem, consecutive pairs being at right angles to each other (decussate). In some narrow-leaved species, for example E. oleosa, the seedling leaves after the second leaf pair are often clustered in a detectable spiral arrangement about a five-sided stem. After the spiral phase, which may last from several to many nodes, the arrangement reverts to decussate by the absorption of some of the leaf-bearing faces of the stem. In those species with opposite adult foliage the leaf pairs, which have been formed opposite at the stem apex, become separated at their bases by unequal elongation of the stem to produce the apparently alternate adult leaves.

=== Flowers and fruits ===
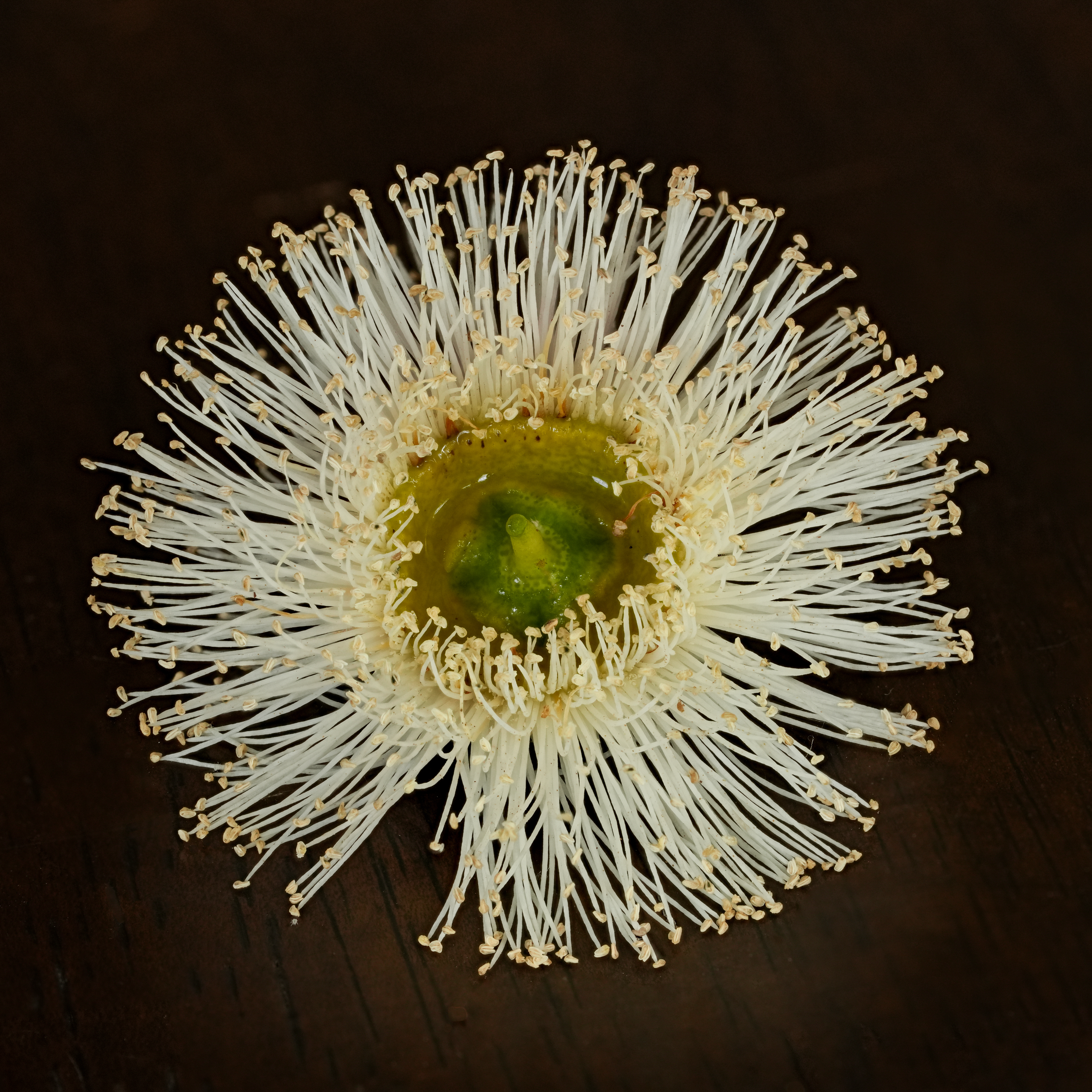
Close-up of a flower, ~4.5 cm (1.8 in) diameter, stamens ~1 cm (0.39 in) long.

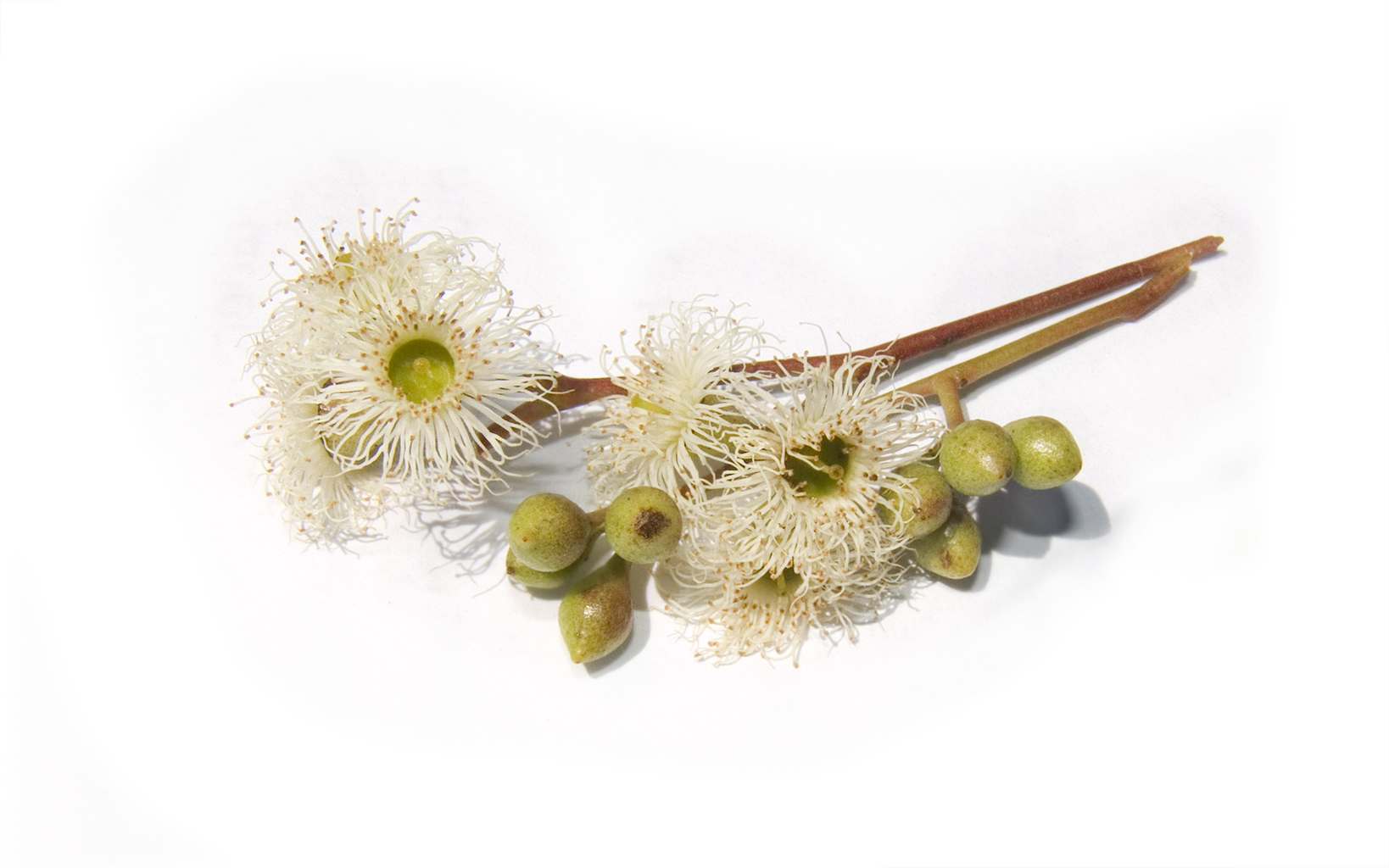
Eucalyptus melliodora, showing flowers and opercula

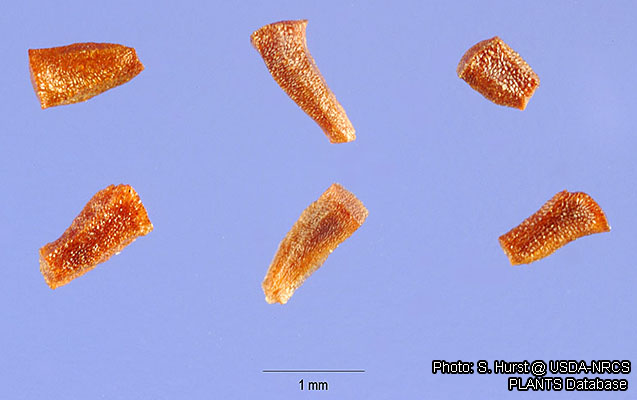
Seeds of Eucalyptus camaldulensis

The most readily recognisable characteristics of eucalyptus species are the distinctive flowers and fruit (capsules or "gumnuts"). Flowers have numerous fluffy stamens which may be white, cream, yellow, pink, or red; in bud, the stamens are enclosed in a cap known as an operculum which is composed of the fused sepals or petals, or both. Thus, flowers have no petals, but instead decorate themselves with the many showy stamens. As the stamens expand, the operculum is forced off, splitting away from the cup-like base of the flower; this is one of the features that unites the genus. The woody fruits or capsules are roughly cone-shaped and have valves at the end which open to release the seeds, which are waxy, rod-shaped, about 1 mm in length, and yellow-brown in colour.

== Taxonomy ==
The genus Eucalyptus was first formally described by Charles Louis L'Héritier de Brutelle who published the description in his book Sertum Anglicum in 1789 [date on title page 1788 but see TL-2], along with a description of the type species, Eucalyptus obliqua.

The type specimen was collected in 1777 by David Nelson, the gardener-botanist on Cook's third voyage. He collected the specimen on Bruny Island and sent it to L'Héritier de Brutelle who was working in London at that time.

== History ==
Although eucalypts must have been seen by the very early European explorers and collectors, no botanical collections of them are known to have been made until 1770 when Joseph Banks and Daniel Solander arrived at Botany Bay with Captain James Cook. There they collected specimens of E. gummifera and later, near the Endeavour River in northern Queensland, E. platyphylla.

In 1777, on Cook's third expedition, David Nelson collected a eucalypt on Bruny Island in southern Tasmania. This specimen was taken to the British Museum in London, and was named Eucalyptus obliqua by the French botanist L'Héritier, who was working in London at the time. He coined the generic name from the Greek roots eu and calyptos, meaning 'well' and 'covered' in reference to the operculum of the flower bud which protects the developing flower parts as the flower develops and is shed by the pressure of the emerging stamens at flowering.

The name obliqua was derived from the Latin obliquus, meaning 'oblique', which is the botanical term describing a leaf base where the two sides of the leaf blade are of unequal length and do not meet the petiole at the same place.

E. obliqua was published in 1788–89, which coincided with the European colonisation of Australia. Between then and the turn of the 19th century, several more species of eucalyptus were named and published. Most of these were by the English botanist James Edward Smith and most were, as might be expected, trees of the Sydney region. These include the economically valuable E. pilularis, E. saligna and E. tereticornis.

The first endemic Western Australian eucalyptus to be collected and subsequently named was the Yate (E. cornuta) by the French botanist Jacques Labillardière, who collected in what is now the Esperance area in 1792.

Several Australian botanists were active during the 19th century, particularly Ferdinand von Mueller, whose work on eucalypts contributed greatly to the first comprehensive account of the genus in George Bentham's Flora Australiensis in 1867. The account is the most important early systematic treatment of the genus. Bentham divided it into five series whose distinctions were based on characteristics of the stamens, particularly the anthers (Mueller, 1879–84), work elaborated by Joseph Henry Maiden (1903–33) and still further by William Faris Blakely (1934). The anther system became too complex to be workable and more recent systematic work has concentrated on the characteristics of buds, fruits, leaves and bark.

=== Species and hybrids ===
Over 700 species of eucalyptus are known. Some have diverged from the mainstream of the genus to the extent that they are quite isolated genetically and are able to be recognised by only a few relatively invariant characteristics. Most, however, may be regarded as belonging to large or small groups of related species, which are often in geographical contact with each other and between which gene exchange still occurs. In these situations, many species appear to grade into one another, and intermediate forms are common. In other words, some species are relatively fixed genetically, as expressed in their morphology, while others have not diverged completely from their nearest relatives.

Hybrid individuals have not always been recognised as such on first collection and some have been named as new species, such as E. chrysantha (E. preissiana × sepulcralis) and E. rivalis (E. marginata × megacarpa). Hybrid combinations are not particularly common in the field, but some other published species frequently seen in Australia have been suggested to be hybrid combinations. For example, Eucalyptus × erythrandra is believed to be E. angulosa × teraptera and due to its wide distribution is often referred to in texts.

Renantherin, a phenolic compound present in the leaves of some eucalyptus species, allows chemotaxonomic discrimination in the sections renantheroideae and renantherae

and the ratio of the amount of leucoanthocyanins varies considerably in certain species.

=== Related genera ===
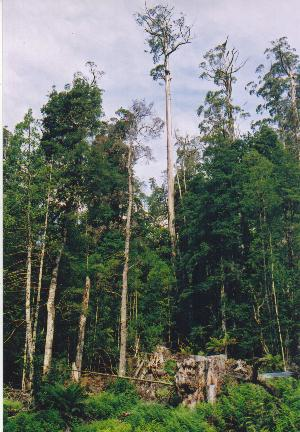
Eucalyptus regnans exceeding 80 metres (260 ft), in an area of extensive logging, Tasmania

Eucalyptus is one of three similar genera that are commonly referred to as "eucalypts", the others being Corymbia and Angophora. Many species, though by no means all, are known as gum trees because they exude copious kino from any break in the bark (e.g., scribbly gum).

== Distribution ==
According to Plants of the World Online, there are more than 715 species of plants in the genus Eucalyptus and most are native to Australia; a very small number are found in adjacent areas of New Guinea and Indonesia. One species, Eucalyptus deglupta, ranges as far north as the Philippines. Of the 15 species found outside Australia, just nine are exclusively non-Australian. Species of eucalyptus are cultivated widely in the tropical and temperate world, including the Americas, Europe, Africa, the Mediterranean Basin, the Middle East, China, and the Indian subcontinent. However, the range over which many eucalypts can be planted in the temperate zone is constrained by their limited cold tolerance.

Australia is covered by 92,000,000 hectares (230,000,000 acres) of eucalypt forest, comprising three quarters of the area covered by native forest. The Blue Mountains of southeastern Australia have been a centre of eucalypt diversification; their name is in reference to the blue haze prevalent in the area, believed derived from the volatile terpenoids emitted by these trees.

== Fossil record ==
The oldest definitive eucalyptus fossils are from Patagonia in South America, where eucalypts are no longer native, though they have been introduced from Australia. The fossils are from the early Eocene (51.9 Mya), and were found in the Laguna del Hunco Formation in Chubut Province in Argentina. This shows that the genus had a Gondwanan distribution. Fossil leaves also occur in the Miocene of New Zealand, where the genus is not native today, but again have been introduced from Australia. A probable fossil of eucalyptus has been uncovered from the Maastrichtian of India.

Despite the prominence of eucalyptuses in modern Australia, estimated to contribute some 75% of the modern vegetation, the fossil record is very scarce throughout much of the Cenozoic, and suggests that this rise to dominance is a geologically more recent phenomenon. The oldest reliably dated macrofossil of the eucalyptus is a 21-million-year-old tree-stump encased in basalt in the upper Lachlan Valley in New South Wales. Other fossils have been found, but many are either unreliably dated or else unreliably identified.

It is useful to consider where eucalyptus fossils have not been found. Extensive research has gone into the fossil floras of the Paleocene to Oligocene of South-Eastern Australia, and has failed to uncover a single eucalyptus specimen. Although the evidence is sparse, the best hypothesis is that in the mid-Tertiary, the continental margins of Australia only supported more mesic noneucalypt vegetation, and that eucalypts probably contributed to the drier vegetation of the arid continental interior. With the progressive drying out of the continent since the Miocene, eucalypts were displaced to the continental margins, and much of the mesic and rainforest vegetation that was once there was eliminated.

The current superdominance of eucalyptus in Australia may be an artefact of human influence on its ecology. In more recent sediments, numerous findings of a dramatic increase in the abundance of eucalyptus pollen are associated with increased charcoal levels. Though this occurs at different rates throughout Australia, it is compelling evidence for a relationship between the artificial increase of fire frequency with the arrival of Aboriginals and increased prevalence of this exceptionally fire-tolerant genus.

== Tall timber ==
Several eucalypt species are among the tallest trees in the world. Eucalyptus regnans, the Australian 'mountain ash', is the tallest of all flowering plants (angiosperms); today, the tallest measured specimen named Centurion is 100.5 m (330 ft) tall. Coast Douglas-fir is about the same height; only coast redwood is taller, and they are conifers (gymnosperms). Six other eucalypt species exceed 80 metres in height: Eucalyptus obliqua, Eucalyptus delegatensis, Eucalyptus diversicolor, Eucalyptus nitens, Eucalyptus globulus and Eucalyptus viminalis.

== Frost intolerance ==
Most eucalypts are not tolerant of severe cold. Eucalypts do well in a range of climates but are usually damaged by anything beyond a light frost of −5 °C (23 °F); the hardiest are the snow gums, such as Eucalyptus pauciflora, which is capable of withstanding cold and frost down to about −20 °C (−4 °F). Two subspecies, E. pauciflora subsp. niphophila and E. pauciflora subsp. debeuzevillei in particular are even hardier and can tolerate even quite severe winters. Several other species, especially from the high plateau and mountains of central Tasmania such as Eucalyptus coccifera, Eucalyptus subcrenulata and Eucalyptus gunnii, have also produced extreme cold-hardy forms and it is seed procured from these genetically hardy strains that are planted for ornament in colder parts of the world.

== Animal relationships ==
An essential oil extracted from eucalyptus leaves contains compounds that are powerful natural disinfectants and can be toxic in large quantities. Several marsupial herbivores, notably koalas and some possums, are relatively tolerant of it. The close correlation of these oils with other more potent toxins called formylated phloroglucinol compounds (euglobals, macrocarpals and sideroxylonals) allows koalas and other marsupial species to make food choices based on the smell of the leaves. For koalas, these compounds are the most important factor in leaf choice.

A wide variety of insects also feed exclusively on eucalyptus leaves, such as beetles in the genus Paropsisterna.

The eusocial beetle Austroplatypus incompertus makes and defends its galleries exclusively inside eucalypts, including some species of eucalyptus and Corymbia.

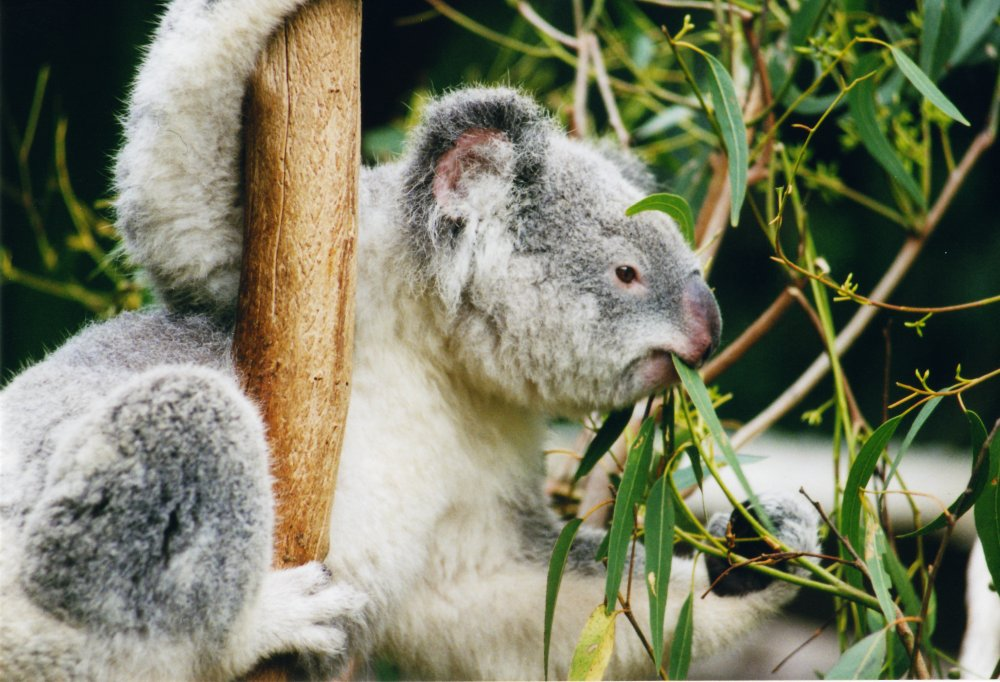
Koala (Phascolarctos cinereus) eating the leaves

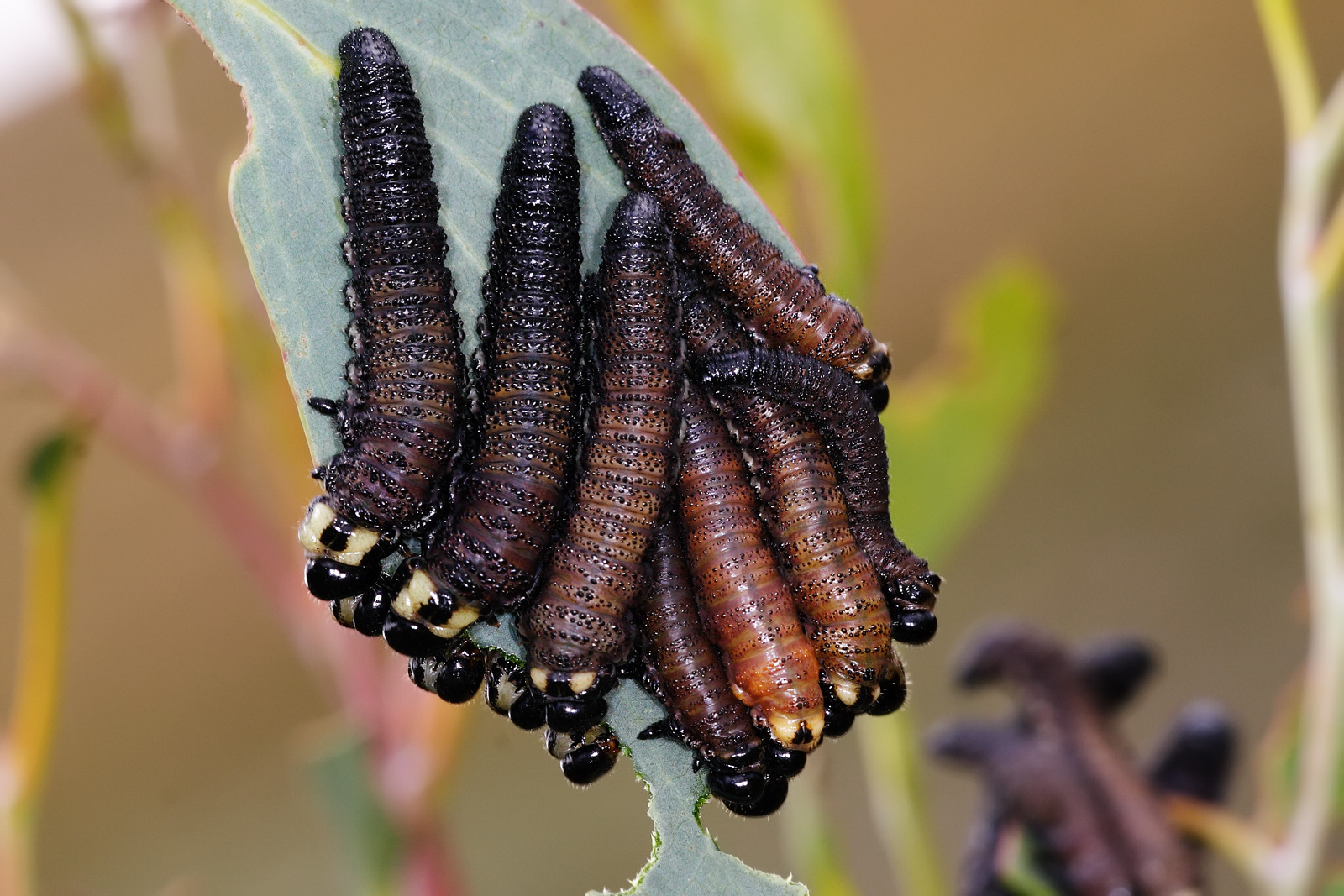
Sawfly larvae feeding on the leaves

Gumnut chewed open by a Cockatoo and the seeds mostly consumed

== Diseases on plants ==
Fungal species Mycosphaerella and Teratosphaeria have been associated with leaf disease on various eucalyptus species. Several fungal species from the Teratosphaeriaceae family are causal agents in leaf diseases and stem cankers of Eucalyptus in Uruguay, and Australia.

== Adaptation to fire ==
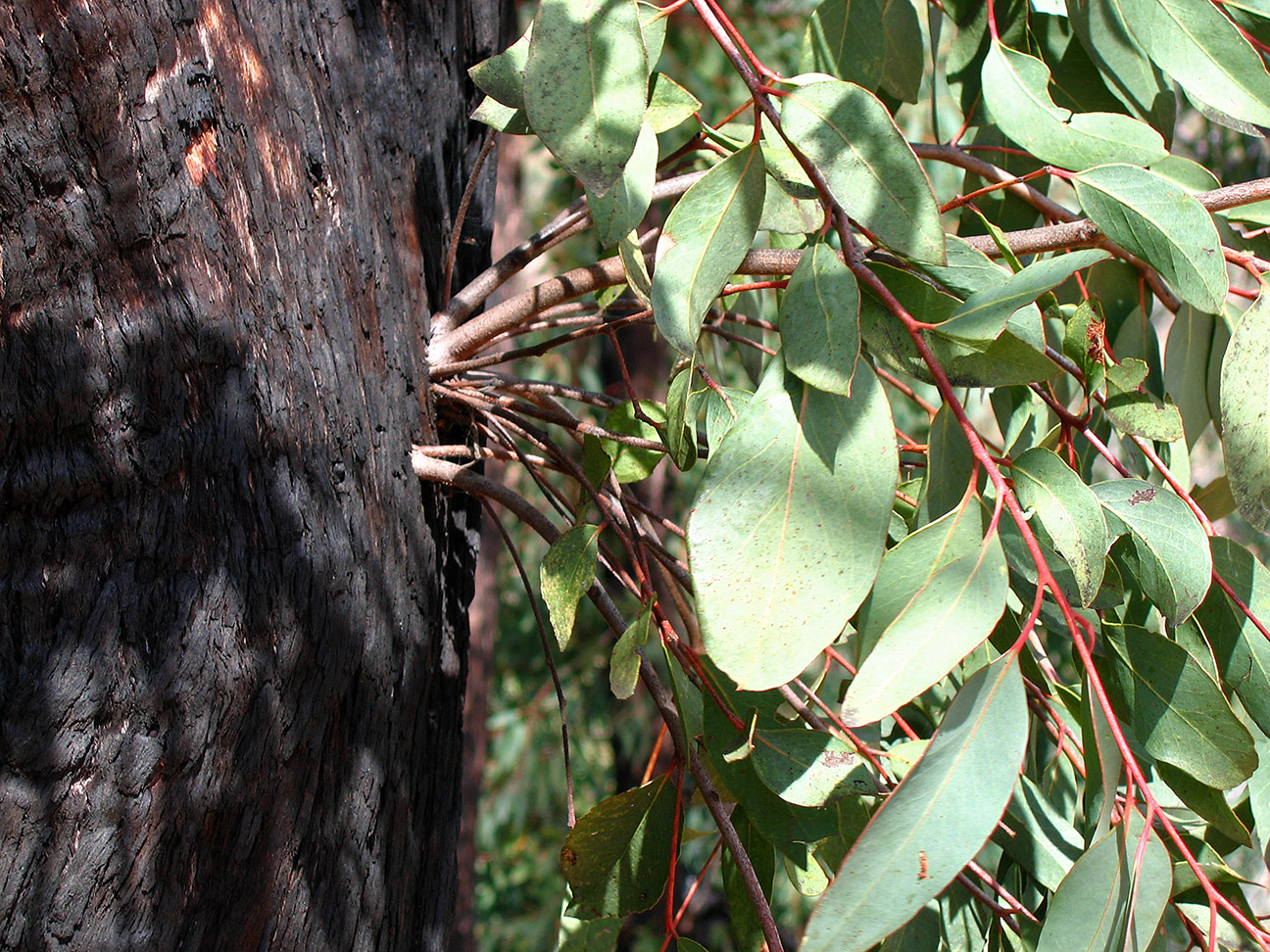
Epicormic shoots sprouting vigorously from epicormic buds beneath the bushfire damaged bark on the trunk of a Eucalyptus tree

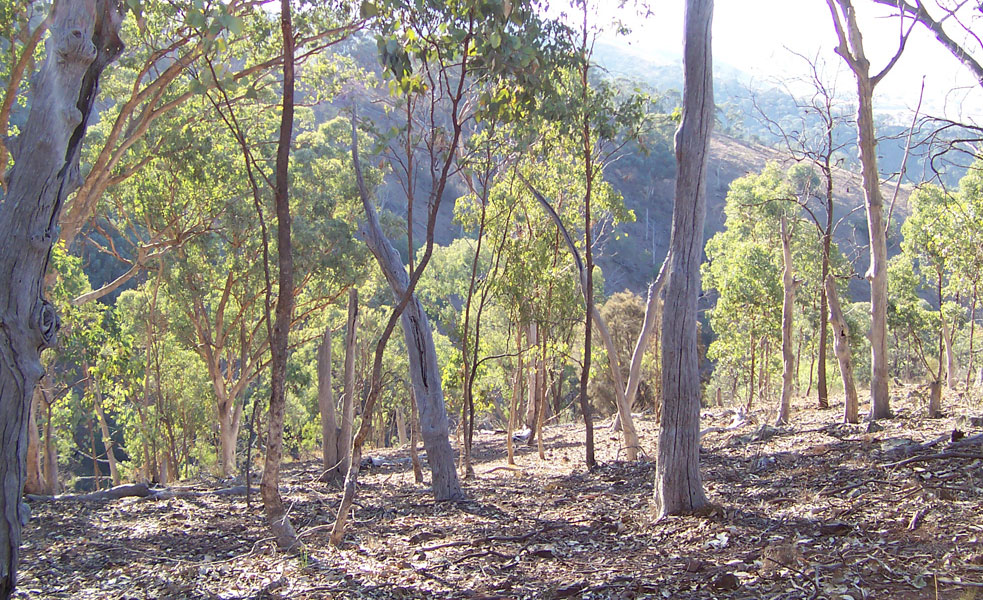
Eucalyptus forest in a state of regeneration

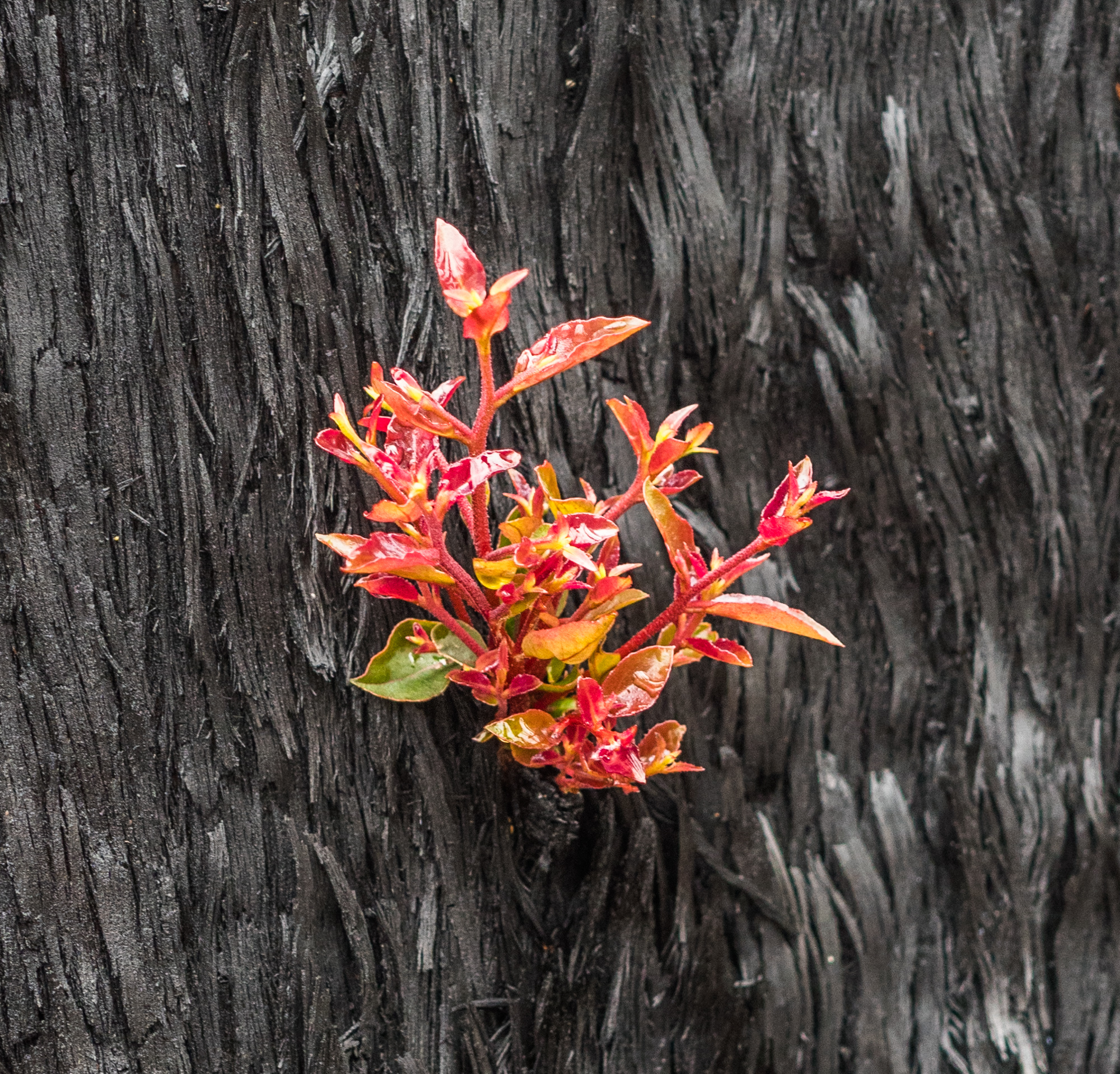
Epicormic growth shooting after the 2019–2020 Australian bushfire season

Eucalypts originated between 35 and 50 million years ago, not long after Australia-New Guinea separated from Gondwana, their rise coinciding with an increase in fossil charcoal deposits (suggesting that fire was a factor even then), but they remained a minor component of the Tertiary rainforest until about 20 million years ago, when the gradual drying of the continent and depletion of soil nutrients led to the development of a more open forest type, predominantly Casuarina and Acacia species.

The two valuable timber trees, alpine ash (E. delegatensis) and Australian mountain ash (E. regnans), are killed by fire and only regenerate from seed. The same 2003 bushfire that had little impact on forests around Canberra resulted in thousands of hectares of dead ash forests. However, a small amount of ash survived and put out new ash trees as well.

=== Fire hazard ===
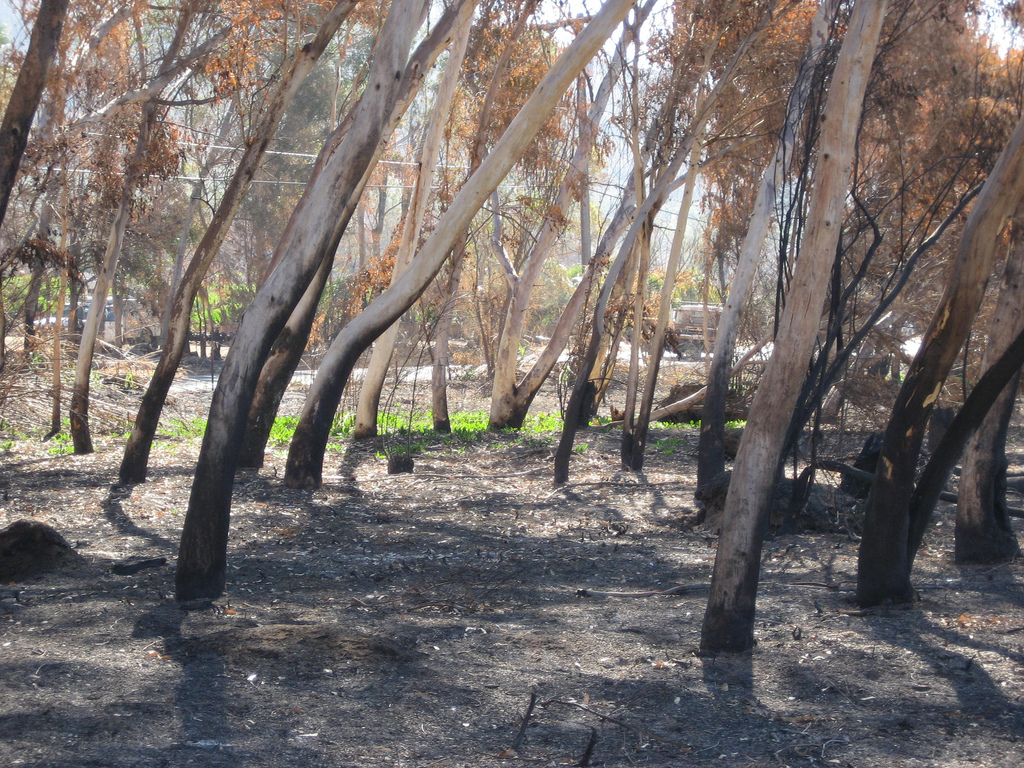
Eucalyptus trees bent over due to the high winds and heat of the October 2007 California wildfires. They are located in the San Dieguito River Park of San Diego County and leaning west.

Eucalyptus oil is highly flammable and at high enough temperatures the oil can expand and thereby quicken the spread of wildfires. Bushfires can travel easily through the oil-rich air of the tree crowns. Eucalypts obtain long-term fire survivability from their ability to regenerate from epicormic buds situated deep within their thick bark, or from lignotubers, or by producing serotinous fruits.

In seasonally dry climates oaks are often fire-resistant, particularly in open grasslands, as a grass fire is insufficient to ignite the scattered trees. In contrast, a eucalyptus forest tends to promote fire because of the volatile and highly combustible oils produced by the leaves, as well as the production of large amounts of litter high in phenolics, preventing its breakdown by fungi and thus accumulating as large amounts of dry, combustible fuel. Consequently, dense eucalypt plantings may be subject to catastrophic firestorms. In fact, almost thirty years before the Oakland firestorm of 1991, a study of eucalyptuses in the area warned that the litter beneath the trees builds up very rapidly and should be regularly monitored and removed. It has been estimated that 70% of the energy released through the combustion of vegetation in the Oakland fire was due to eucalyptuses. In a National Park Service study, it was found that the fuel load (in tons per acre) of non-native eucalyptus woods is almost three times as great as native oak woodland.

During World War II, one California town cut down their eucalyptus trees to "about a third of their height in the vicinity of anti-aircraft guns" because of the known fire-fueling qualities of the trees, with the mayor telling a newspaper reporter, "If a shell so much as hits a leaf, it's supposed to explode."

== Falling branches ==
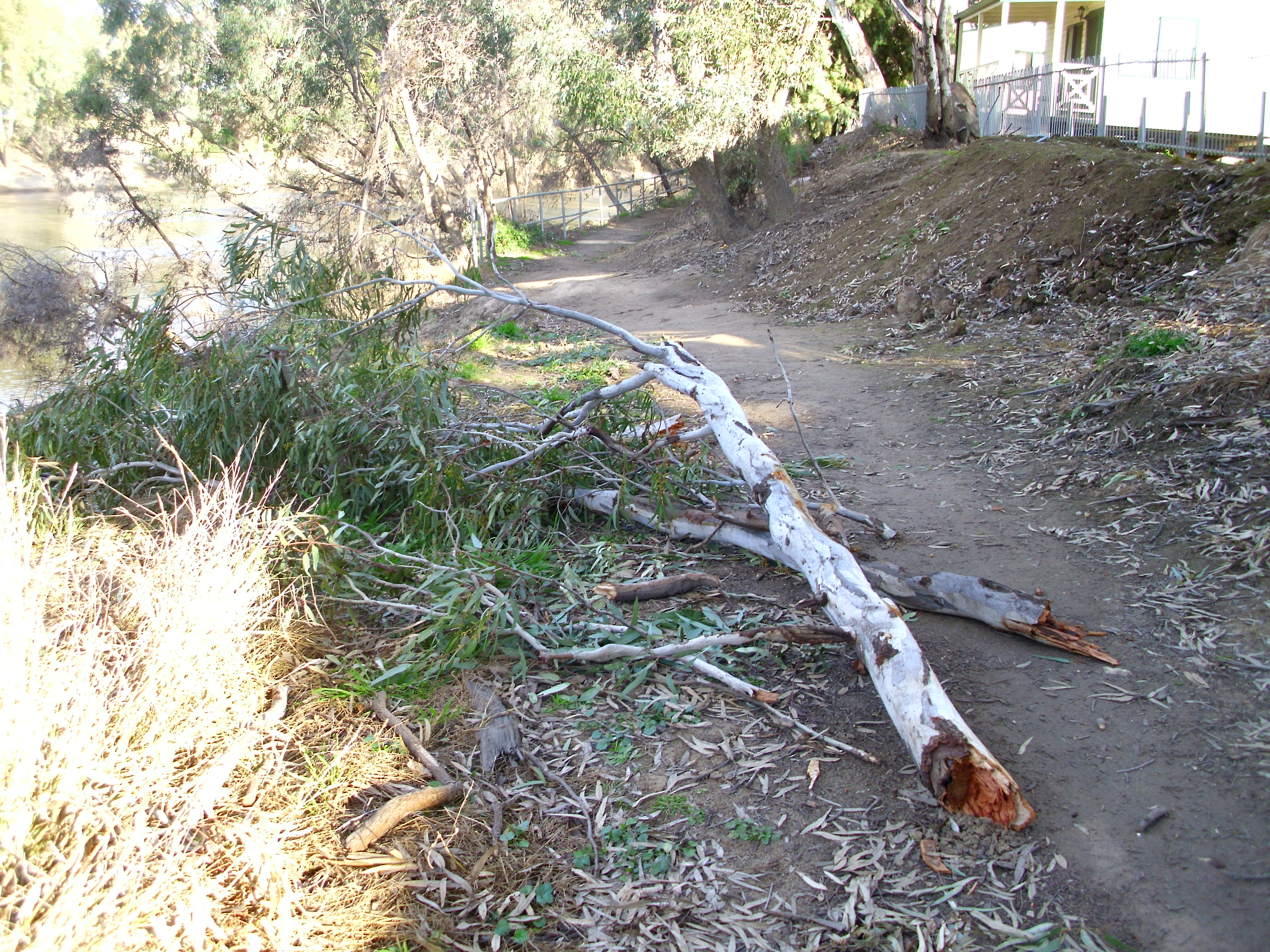
Fallen E. camaldulensis limbs on a walking track

Some species of eucalyptus drop branches unexpectedly. In Australia, Parks Victoria warns campers not to camp under river red gums. Some councils in Australia such as Gosnells, Western Australia, have removed eucalypts after reports of damage from dropped branches, even in the face of lengthy, well publicised protests to protect particular trees. A former Australian National Botanic Gardens director and consulting arborist, Robert Boden, has been quoted referring to "summer branch drop". Deaths have occurred from sudden branch drops such as the death of 22-year old Alifia Soeryo in 2024 who was taking a break under a river gum, and the death of 8-year old Bridget Wright at school in 2014. Before both deaths, the trees were either regularly inspected or inspected recently, assessed and not considered dangerous by maintenance, highlighting the unpredictability of gum branch drop. In fiction, the dropping of branches is recognised in Australia literature like the fictional death of Judy in Seven Little Australians. Although all large trees can drop branches, the density of eucalyptus wood is high due to its high resin content, increasing the hazard.

== Cultivation and uses ==
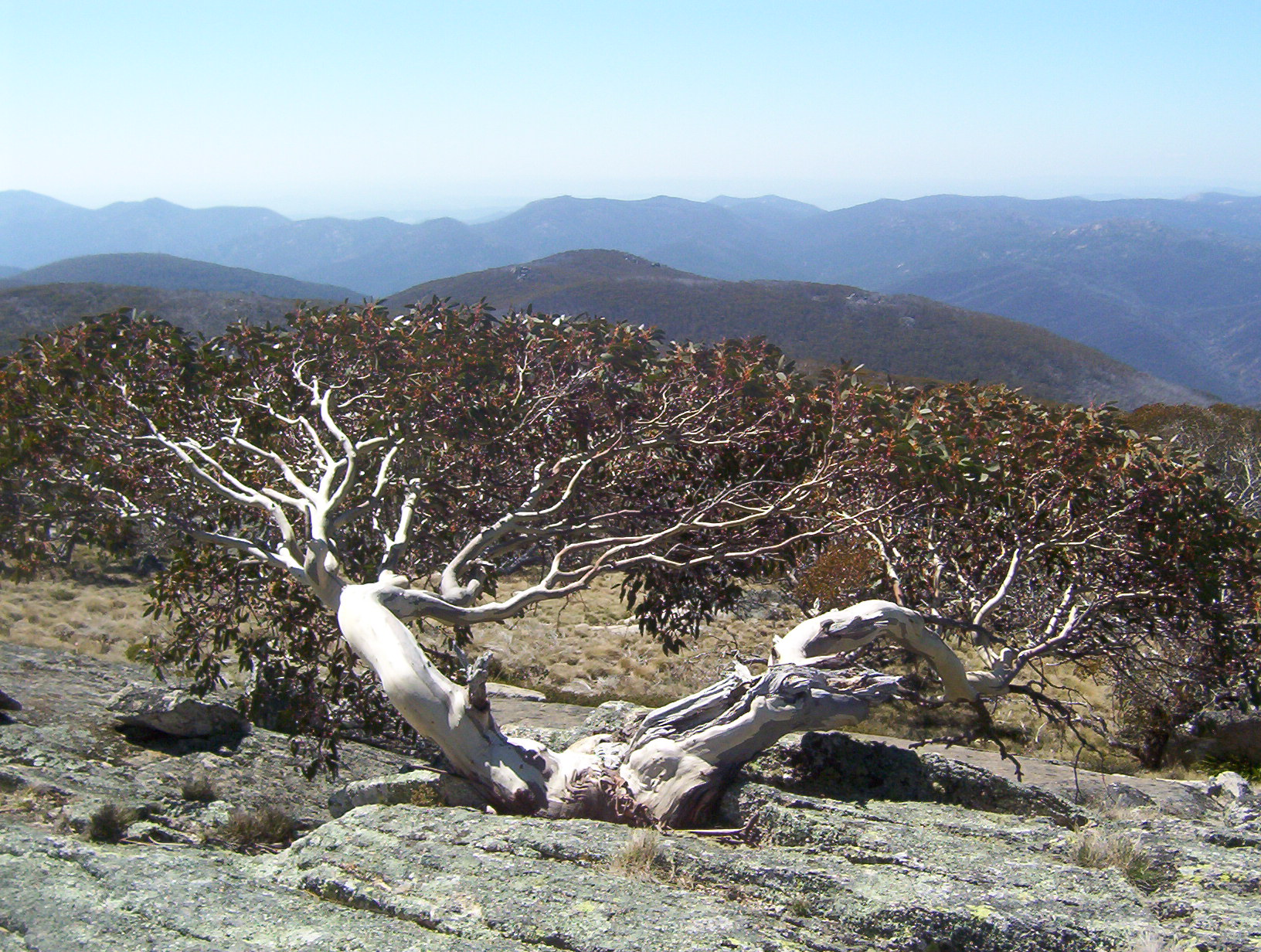
Snow gum in Namadgi National Park

Eucalypts were introduced from Australia to the rest of the world following the Cook expedition in 1770. Collected by Sir Joseph Banks, botanist on the expedition, they were subsequently introduced to many parts of the world, notably California, southern Europe, Africa, the Middle East, South Asia and South America. About 250 species are under cultivation in California. In Portugal and also Spain, eucalypts have been grown in plantations for the production of pulpwood. Eucalyptuses are the basis for several industries, such as sawmilling, pulp, charcoal and others. Several species have become invasive and are causing major problems for local ecosystems, mainly due to the absence of wildlife corridors and rotations management.

Eucalypts have many uses which have made them economically important trees, and they have become a cash crop in poor areas such as Timbuktu, Mali and the Peruvian Andes, despite concerns that the trees are invasive in some environments like those of South Africa. Best-known are perhaps the varieties karri and yellow box. Due to their fast growth, the foremost benefit of these trees is their wood. They can be chopped off at the root and grow back again. They provide many desirable characteristics for use as ornament, timber, firewood and pulpwood. Eucalyptus wood is also used in a number of industries, from fence posts (where the oil-rich wood's high resistance to decay is valued) and charcoal to cellulose extraction for biofuels. Fast growth also makes eucalypts suitable as windbreaks and to reduce erosion.

Some eucalyptus species have attracted attention from horticulturists, global development researchers, and environmentalists because of desirable traits such as being fast-growing sources of wood, producing oil that can be used for cleaning and as a natural insecticide, or an ability to be used to drain swamps and thereby reduce the risk of malaria. Eucalyptus oil finds many uses like in fuels, fragrances, insect repellence and antimicrobial activity. Eucalyptus trees show allelopathic effects; they release compounds which inhibit other plant species from growing nearby. Outside their natural ranges, eucalypts are both lauded for their beneficial economic impact on poor populations and criticised for being "water-guzzling" aliens, leading to controversy over their total impact.

Eucalypts draw a tremendous amount of water from the soil through the process of transpiration. They have been planted (or re-planted) in some places to lower the water table and reduce soil salination. Eucalypts have also been used as a way of reducing malaria by draining the soil in Algeria, Lebanon, Sicily, elsewhere in Europe, in the Caucasus (Western Georgia), and California. Drainage removes swamps which provide a habitat for mosquito larvae, but can also destroy ecologically productive areas. This drainage is not limited to the soil surface, because the Eucalyptus roots are up to 2.5 m (8 ft 2 in) in length and can, depending on the location, even reach the water table (the top boundary of the phreatic zone).

=== Pulpwood ===
Eucalyptus is the most common short fibre source for pulpwood to make pulp. The types most often used in papermaking are Eucalyptus globulus (in temperate areas) and the Eucalyptus urophylla x Eucalyptus grandis hybrid (in the tropics). The fibre length of Eucalyptus is relatively short and uniform with low coarseness compared with other hardwoods commonly used as pulpwood. The fibres are slender, yet relatively thick walled. This gives uniform paper formation and high opacity that are important for all types of fine papers. The low coarseness is important for high quality coated papers. Eucalyptus is suitable for many tissue papers as the short and slender fibres gives a high number of fibres per gram and low coarseness contributes to softness.

=== Eucalyptus oil ===
Eucalyptus oil is readily steam distilled from the leaves and can be used for cleaning and as an industrial solvent, as an antiseptic, for deodorising, and in very small quantities in food supplements, especially sweets, cough drops, toothpaste and decongestants. It has insect-repellent properties, and serves as an active ingredient in some commercial mosquito-repellents. Aromatherapists have adopted Eucalyptus oils for a wide range of purposes. Eucalyptus globulus is the principal source of Eucalyptus oil worldwide.

=== Musical instruments ===
Eucalypt wood is also commonly used to make didgeridoos, a traditional Australian Aboriginal wind instrument. The trunk of the tree is hollowed out by termites, and then cut down if the bore is of the correct size and shape.

Eucalypt wood is also being used as a tonewood and a fingerboard material for acoustic guitars, notably by the California-based Taylor company.

=== Dyes ===
All parts of Eucalyptus may be used to make dyes that are substantive on protein fibres (such as silk and wool), simply by processing the plant part with water. Colours to be achieved range from yellow and orange through green, tan, chocolate and deep rust red.

=== Prospecting ===
Eucalyptus trees in the Australian outback draw up gold from tens of metres underground through their root system and deposit it as particles in their leaves and branches. A Maia detector for x-ray elemental imaging at the Australian Synchrotron clearly showed deposits of gold and other metals in the structure of Eucalyptus leaves from the Kalgoorlie region of Western Australia that would have been untraceable using other methods. The microscopic leaf-bound "nuggets", about 8 micrometres wide on average, are not worth collecting themselves, but may provide an environmentally benign way of locating subsurface mineral deposits.

== Eucalyptus as plantation species ==
In the 20th century, scientists around the world experimented with Eucalyptus species. They hoped to grow them in the tropics, but most experimental results failed until breakthroughs in the 1960s-1980s in species selection, silviculture, and breeding programs "unlocked" the potential of eucalypts in the tropics. Prior to then, as Brett Bennett noted in a 2010 article, eucalypts were something of the "El Dorado" of forestry. Today, Eucalyptus is the most widely planted type of tree in plantations around the world, in South America (mainly in Brazil, Argentina, Paraguay and Uruguay), South Africa, Australia, India, Galicia, Portugal and many more.

=== North America ===
California

In the 1850s, Eucalyptus trees were introduced to California by Australians during the California Gold Rush. Much of California is similar in climate to parts of Australia. By the early 1900s, thousands of acres of eucalypts were planted with the encouragement of the state government. It was hoped that they would provide a renewable source of timber for construction, furniture making and railway sleepers. It was soon found that for the latter purpose Eucalyptus was particularly unsuitable, as the ties made from Eucalyptus had a tendency to twist while drying, and the dried ties were so tough that it was nearly impossible to hammer rail spikes into them.

They went on to note that the promise of Eucalyptus in California was based on the old virgin forests of Australia. This was a mistake, as the young trees being harvested in California could not compare in quality to the centuries-old Eucalyptus timber of Australia. It reacted differently to harvest. The older trees didn't split or warp as the infant California crop did. There was a vast difference between the two, and this would doom the California Eucalyptus industry.

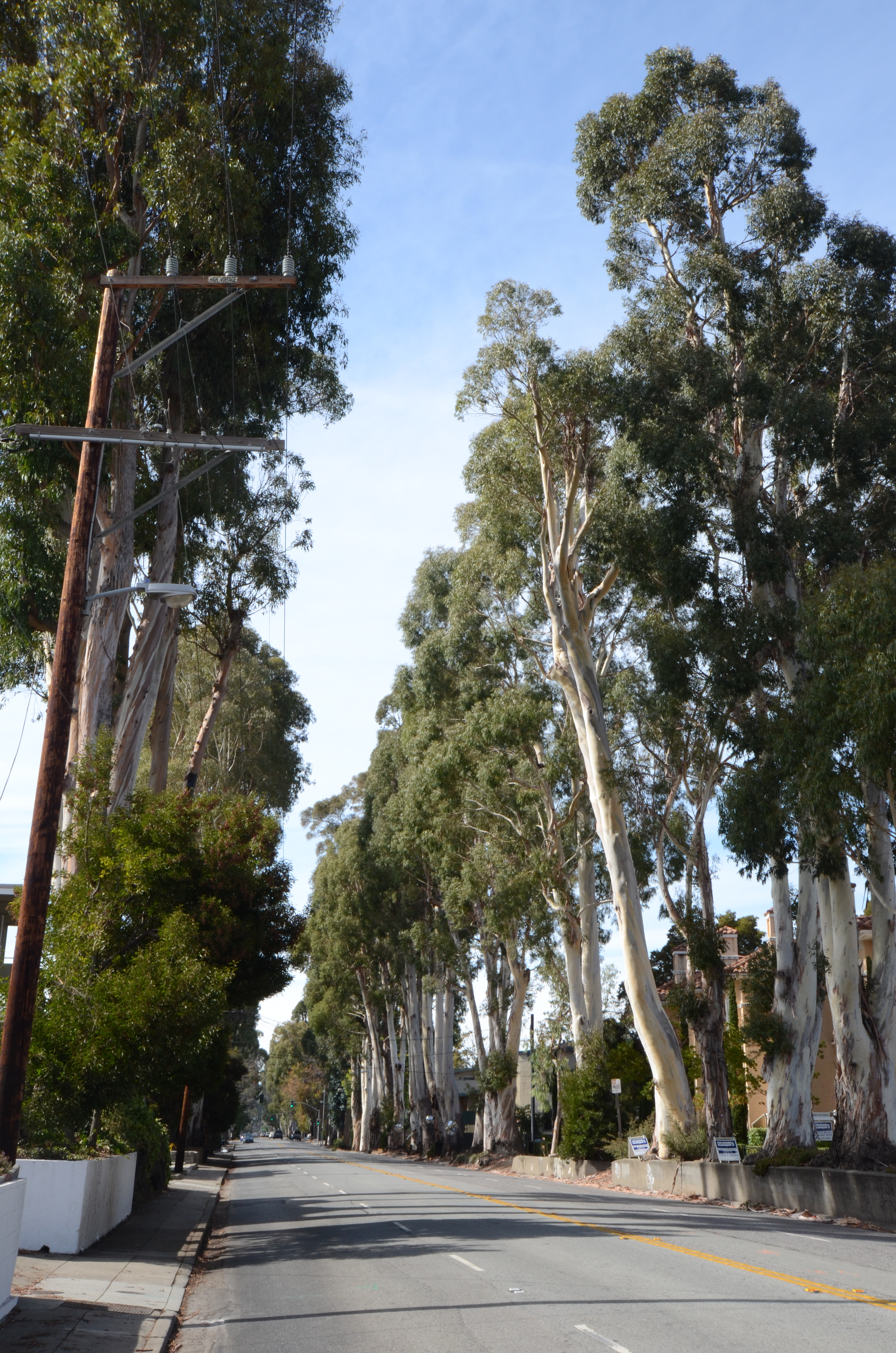
The Howard-Ralston Eucalyptus Tree Rows, planted in Burlingame, California, in the 1870s, are listed on the National Register of Historic Places.

The species E. camaldulensis, E. tereticornis, and E. cladocalyx are all present in California, but the blue gum E. globulus makes up by far the largest population in the state. One way in which the Eucalyptus, mainly the blue gum E. globulus, proved valuable in California was in providing windbreaks for highways, orange groves, and farms in the mostly treeless central part of the state. They are also admired as shade and ornamental trees in many cities and gardens.

Eucalyptus plantations in California have been criticised, because they compete with native plants and typically do not support native animals. Eucalyptus has historically been planted to replace California's coast live oak population, and the new Eucalyptus is not as hospitable to native flora and fauna as the oaks. In appropriately foggy conditions on the California Coast, Eucalyptus can spread at a rapid rate. The absence of natural inhibitors such as the koala or pathogens native to Australia have aided in the spread of California Eucalyptus trees. This is not as big of an issue further inland, but on the coast invasive eucalypts can disrupt native ecosystems. Eucalyptus may have adverse effects on local streams due to their chemical composition, and their dominance threatens species that rely on native trees. Nevertheless, some native species have been known to adapt to the Eucalyptus trees. Notable examples are herons, great horned owl, and the monarch butterfly using Eucalyptus groves as habitat. Despite these successes, eucalypts generally has a net negative impact on the overall balance of the native ecosystem.

A heavy concern regarding Eucalypts in California is their status as a fire hazard. Eucalyptus trees were a catalyst for the spread of the 1923 fire in Berkeley, which destroyed 568 homes. The 1991 Oakland Hills firestorm, which caused US$1.5 billion in damage, destroyed almost 3,000 homes, and killed 25 people, was partly fueled by large numbers of eucalypts close to the houses.

Despite these issues, there are calls to preserve the Eucalyptus plants in California. Advocates for the tree claim its fire risk has been overstated. Some even claim that the Eucalyptus's absorption of moisture makes it a barrier against fire. These experts believe that the herbicides used to remove the Eucalyptus would negatively impact the ecosystem, and the loss of the trees would release carbon into the atmosphere unnecessarily. There is also an aesthetic argument for keeping the Eucalyptus; the trees are viewed by many as an attractive and iconic part of the California landscape. Many say that although the tree is not native, it has been in California long enough to become an essential part of the ecosystem and therefore should not be attacked as invasive. These arguments have caused experts and citizens in California, especially in the San Francisco Bay Area, to debate the merits of Eucalyptus removal versus preservation. However, the general consensus remains that some areas urgently require Eucalyptus management to stave off potential fire hazards.

Efforts to remove some of California's Eucalyptus trees have been met with a mixed reaction from the public, and there have been protests against removal. Removing Eucalyptus trees can be expensive and often requires machinery or the use of herbicides. The trees struggle to reproduce on their own outside of the foggy regions of Coastal California, and therefore some inland Eucalyptus forests are predicted to die out naturally. In some parts of California, eucalypt plantations are being removed and native trees and plants restored. Individuals have also illegally destroyed some trees and are suspected of introducing insect pests from Australia which attack the trees.

Certain Eucalyptus species may also be grown for ornament in warmer parts of the Pacific Northwest—western Washington, western Oregon and southwestern British Columbia.

In the state of Florida, they were introduced for the purpose of manufacturing timber. There they are seen as being an extreme risk to the native habitat. It is also grown for ornamental purposes in Arizona.

==== Cuba ====
Eucalyptus was introduced to Cuba in 1867. The goal was more lucrative plantations for wood production.

==== Puerto Rico ====
Eucalyptus, among other non-native trees, has been planted in Puerto Rico for purposes of timber, fuel, and other goods for regional communities, and is considered to be a part of landscape oversight to the benefit of rural districts. However, there is also an accusation that Eucalyptus and other foreign species deplete soil nutrients and water, and are detrimental to native plants.

=== South America ===
Argentina

It was introduced in Argentina around 1870 by President Domingo F. Sarmiento, who had brought the seeds from Australia and it quickly became very popular. The most widely planted species were E. globulus, E. viminalis and E. rostrata. Currently, the Humid Pampas region has small forests and Eucalyptus barriers, some up to 80 years old, about 50 meters high and a maximum of one meter in diameter.

Uruguay

Antonio Lussich introduced Eucalyptus into Uruguay in approximately 1896, throughout what is now Maldonado Department, and it has spread all over the south-eastern and eastern coast. There had been no trees in the area because it consisted of dry sand dunes and stones. Lussich also introduced many other trees, particularly Acacia and pines, but they have not expanded so extensively.

Uruguayan forestry crops using Eucalyptus species have been promoted since 1989, when the new National Forestry Law established that 20% of the national territory would be dedicated to forestry. As the main landscape of Uruguay is grassland (140,000 km^{2}, 87% of the national territory), most of the forestry plantations would be established in prairie regions. The planting of Eucalyptus sp. has been criticised because of concerns that soil would be degraded by nutrient depletion and other biological changes. During the last ten years, in the northwestern regions of Uruguay the Eucalyptus sp. plantations have reached annual forestation rates of 300%. That zone has a potential forested area of 1 million hectares, approximately 29% of the national territory dedicated to forestry, of which approximately 800,000 hectares are currently forested by monoculture of Eucalyptus spp. It is expected that the radical and durable substitution of vegetation cover leads to changes in the quantity and quality of soil organic matter. Such changes may also influence soil fertility and soil physical and chemical properties. The soil quality effects associated with Eucalyptus sp. plantations could have adverse effects on soil chemistry; for example: soil acidification, iron leaching, allelopathic activities and a high C:N ratio of litter. Additionally, as most scientific understanding of land cover change effects is related to ecosystems where forests were replaced by grasslands or crops, or grassland was replaced by crops, the environmental effects of the current Uruguayan land cover changes are not well understood. The first scientific publication on soil studies in western zone tree plantations (focused on pulp production) appeared in 2004 and described soil acidification and soil carbon changes, similar to a podzolisation process, and destruction of clay (illite-like minerals), which is the main reservoir of potassium in the soil. Although these studies were carried out in an important zone for forest cultivation, they cannot define the current situation in the rest of the land area under eucalyptus cultivation. Moreover, recently Jackson and Jobbagy have proposed another adverse environmental impact that may result from Eucalyptus culture on prairie soils—stream acidification.

The Eucalyptus species most planted are E. grandis, E. globulus and E. dunnii; they are used mainly for pulp mills. Approximately 80,000 ha of E. grandis situated in the departments of Rivera, Tacuarembó and Paysandú is primarily earmarked for the solid wood market, although a portion of it is used for sawlogs and plywood. The current area under commercial forest plantation is 6% of the total. The main uses of the wood produced are elemental chlorine free pulp mill production (for cellulose and paper), sawlogs, plywood and bioenergy (thermoelectric generation). Most of the products obtained from sawmills and pulp mills, as well as plywood and logs, are exported. This has raised the income of this sector with respect to traditional products from other sectors. Uruguayan forestry plantations have rates of growth of 30 cubic metres per hectare per year and commercial harvesting occurs after nine years.

Brazil

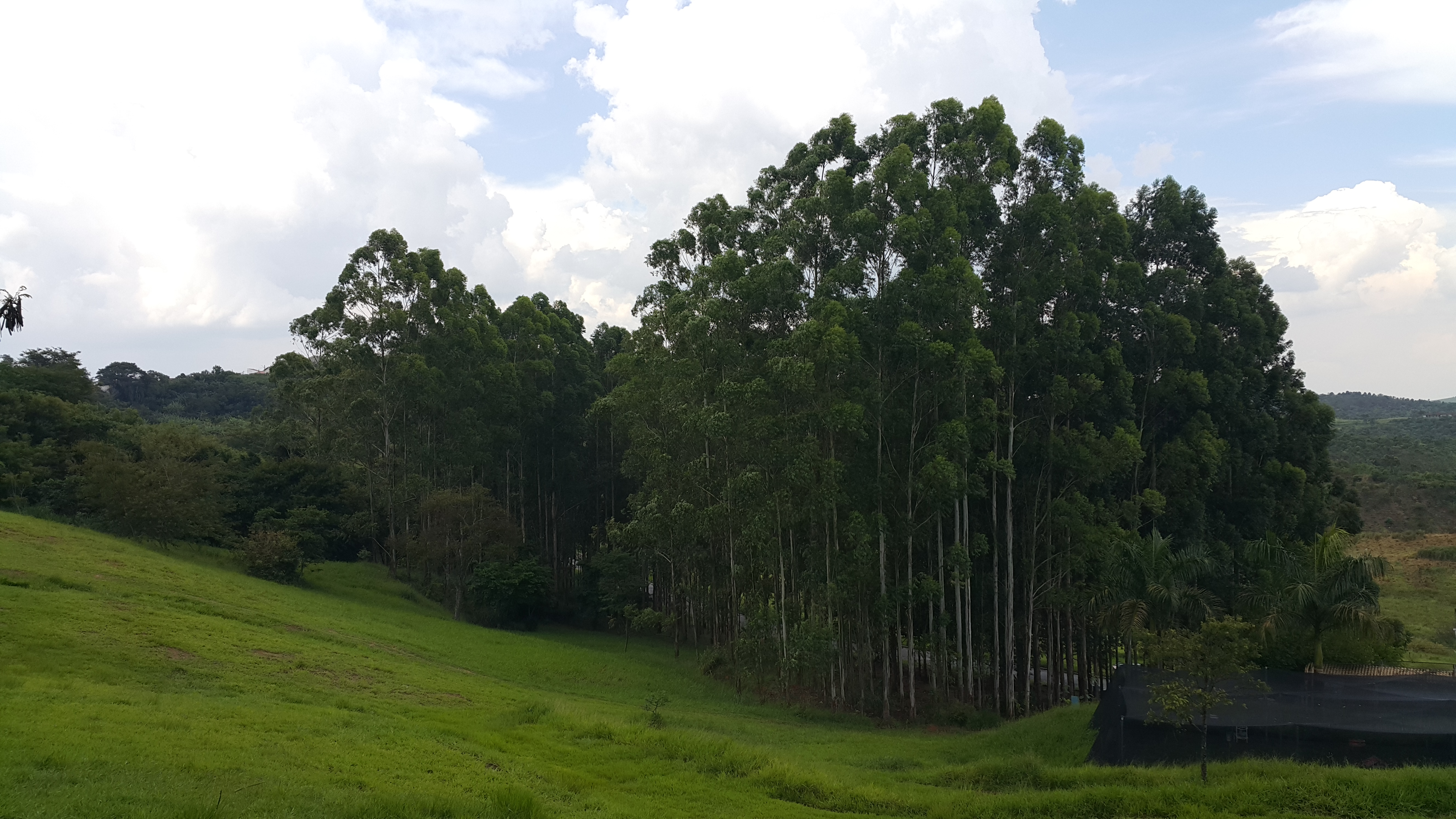
A c. 13-year-old plantation, in Taubaté, São Paulo

Eucalypts were introduced to Brazil in 1910, for timber substitution and the charcoal industry. It has thrived in the local environment, and today there are around 7 million hectares planted. The wood is highly valued by the charcoal and pulp and paper industries. The short rotation allows a larger wood production and supplies wood for several other activities, helping to preserve the native forests from logging. When well managed, the plantation soils can sustain endless replanting. Eucalyptus plantings are also used as wind breaks. Brazil's plantations have world-record rates of growth, typically over 40 cubic metres per hectare per year, and commercial harvesting occurs after years 5. Due to continual development and governmental funding, year-on-year growth is consistently being improved. Eucalyptus can produce up to 100 cubic metres per hectare per year. Brazil has become the top exporter and producer of Eucalyptus round wood and pulp, and has played an important role in developing the Australian market through the country's committed research in this area.

Modern management systems for Eucalyptus plantations often involve careful selection of initial spacing and thinning regimes, which can significantly influence both wood yield and quality. Innovative approaches, such as coppice-with-standards silvicultural systems, have also been reviewed and implemented to optimize biomass production while maintaining sustainability and flexibility in wood uses. Pruning practices in Eucalyptus grandis × Eucalyptus urophylla plantations have been shown to affect growth dynamics and wood quality, supporting their use in high-value timber, pulp, energy, and other wood-based products. The novelty of these management strategies lies in their adaptability to local conditions and market requirements, allowing for the production of wood suited for a range of uses, including bioenergy, construction, and industrial applications.

At the same time, local iron producers in Brazil rely heavily on sustainably grown Eucalyptus for charcoal; this has greatly pushed up the price of charcoal in recent years. The plantations are generally owned and operated for national and international industry by timber asset companies such as Thomson Forestry, Greenwood Management or cellulose producers such as Aracruz Cellulose and Stora Enso.

Overall, South America was expected to produce 55% of the world's Eucalyptus round-wood by 2010. Many environmental NGOs have criticised the use of exotic tree species for forestry in Latin America.

=== Africa ===
Angola

In the East of Angola, the Benguela railway company created eucalyptus plantations for firing its steam locomotives.

Ethiopia

Eucalypts were introduced to Ethiopia in either 1894 or 1895, either by Emperor Menelik II's French advisor Mondon-Vidailhet or by the Englishman Captain O'Brian. Menelik II endorsed its planting around his new capital city of Addis Ababa because of the massive deforestation around the city for firewood. According to Richard R.K. Pankhurst, "The great advantage of the eucalypts was that they were fast growing, required little attention and when cut down grew up again from the roots; it could be harvested every ten years. The tree proved successful from the onset". Plantations of eucalypts spread from the capital to other growing urban centres such as Debre Marqos. Pankhurst reports that the most common species found in Addis Ababa in the mid-1960s was E. globulus, although he also found E. melliodora and E. rostrata in significant numbers. David Buxton, writing of central Ethiopia in the mid-1940s, observed that eucalyptus trees "have become an integral -- and a pleasing -- element in the Shoan landscape and has largely displaced the slow-growing native 'cedar' (Juniperus procera)".

It was commonly believed that the thirst of the Eucalyptus "tended to dry up rivers and wells", creating such opposition to the species that in 1913 a proclamation was issued ordering a partial destruction of all standing trees, and their replacement with mulberry trees. Pankhurst reports, "The proclamation however remained a dead letter; there is no evidence of eucalypts being uprooted, still less of mulberry trees being planted." Eucalypts remain a defining feature of Addis Ababa.

Madagascar

Much of Madagascar's original native forest has been replaced with Eucalyptus, threatening biodiversity by isolating remaining natural areas such as Andasibe-Mantadia National Park.

South Africa

Numerous Eucalyptus species have been introduced into South Africa, mainly for timber and firewood but also for ornamental purposes. They are popular with beekeepers for the honey they provide. However, in South Africa they are considered invasive, with their water-sucking capabilities threatening water supplies. They also release a chemical into the surrounding soil which kills native competitors.

Eucalyptus seedlings are usually unable to compete with the indigenous grasses, but after a fire when the grass cover has been removed, a seed-bed may be created. The following Eucalyptus species have been able to become naturalised in South Africa: E. camaldulensis, E. cladocalyx, E. diversicolor, E. grandis and E. lehmannii.

Zimbabwe

As in South Africa, many Eucalyptus species have been introduced into Zimbabwe, mainly for timber and firewood, and E. robusta and E. tereticornis have been recorded as having become naturalised there.

=== Europe ===
==== Portugal ====
Eucalypts have been grown in Portugal since the mid 19th century, the first thought to be a specimen of E. obliqua introduced to Vila Nova de Gaia in 1829. First as an ornamental but soon after in plantations, these eucalypts are prized due to their long and upright trunks, rapid growth and the ability to regrow after cutting. These plantations now occupy around 800,000 hectares, 10% of the country's total land area, 90% of the trees being E. globulus. As of the late 20th century, there were an estimated 120 species of Eucalyptus in Portugal. The genus has also been subject to various controversies. Despite representing a large part of the agricultural economy, eucalypt plantations have a negative impact on soil destruction, inducing resistance to water infiltration and increasing the risks of erosion and soil loss, they are highly flammable, aggravating the risk for wildfires. Various Portuguese laws on eucalypt plantations have been formed and reformed to better suit both sides.

There are various Eucalyptus species of public interest in Portugal, namely a Karri in Coimbra's Mata Nacional de Vale de Canas, considered to be Europe's tallest tree at 72 m (236 ft) high.

==== Italy ====
In Italy, the Eucalyptus only arrived at the turn of the 19th century and large scale plantations were started at the beginning of the 20th century with the aim of drying up swampy ground to defeat malaria. During the 1930s, Benito Mussolini had thousands of Eucalyptus planted in the marshes around Rome. This, their rapid growth in the Italian climate and excellent function as windbreaks, has made them a common sight in the south of the country, including the islands of Sardinia and Sicily. They are also valued for the characteristic smelling and tasting honey that is produced from them. The variety of Eucalyptus most commonly found in Italy is E. camaldulensis.

==== Greece ====
In Greece, eucalypts are widely found, especially in southern Greece and Crete. They are cultivated and used for various purposes, including as an ingredient in pharmaceutical products (e.g., creams, elixirs and sprays) and for leather production. They were imported in 1862 by botanist Theodoros Georgios Orphanides. The principal species is E. globulus.

==== Ireland ====
Eucalyptus has been grown in Ireland since trials in the 1930s and now grows wild in South Western Ireland in the mild climate.

=== Asia ===
Eucalyptus seeds of the species E. globulus were imported into Palestine in the 1860s, but did not acclimatise well. Later, E. camaldulensis was introduced more successfully and it is still a very common tree in Israel. The use of Eucalyptus trees to drain swampy land was a common practice in the late nineteenth and early twentieth centuries. The German Templer colony of Sarona had begun planting Eucalyptus for this purpose by 1874, though it is not known where the seeds came from. Many Zionist colonies also adopted the practice in the following years under the guidance of the Mikveh Israel Agricultural School. Eucalyptus trees are now considered an invasive species in the region. In spite of this, there are many revered specimens, even in urban landscapes like Tel Aviv and its environs. One which originated Queensland, Australia and was planted in 1883, remains gracing an otherwise non-descriptive street in Petah Tikvah, exuding a heady lemon scent.

In India, the Institute of Forest Genetics and Tree Breeding, Coimbatore started a Eucalyptus breeding program in the 1990s. The organisation released four varieties of conventionally bred, high yielding and genetically improved clones for commercial and research interests in 2010.

Eucalyptus trees were introduced to Sri Lanka in the late 19th century by tea and coffee planters, for wind protection, shade and fuel. Forestry replanting of Eucalyptus began in the 1930s in deforested mountain areas, and currently there are about 10 species present in the island. They account for 20% of major reforestation plantings. They provide railway sleepers, utility poles, sawn timber and fuelwood, but are controversial because of their adverse effect on biodiversity, hydrology and soil fertility. They are associated with another invasive species, the eucalyptus gall wasp, Leptocybe invasa.

=== Pacific Islands ===
In Hawaii, some 90 species of Eucalyptus have been introduced to the islands, where they have displaced some native species due to their higher maximum height, fast growth and lower water needs. Particularly noticeable is the rainbow eucalyptus (Eucalyptus deglupta), native to Indonesia and the Philippines, whose bark falls off to reveal a trunk that can be green, red, orange, yellow, pink and purple.

== Non-native Eucalyptus and biodiversity ==
Due to similar favourable climatic conditions, Eucalyptus plantations have often replaced oak woodlands, for example in California, Spain and Portugal. The resulting monocultures have raised concerns about loss of biological diversity, through loss of acorns that mammals and birds feed on, absence of hollows that in oak trees provide shelter and nesting sites for birds and small mammals and for bee colonies, as well as lack of downed trees in managed plantations. A study of the relationship between birds and Eucalyptus in the San Francisco Bay Area found that bird diversity was similar in native forest versus Eucalyptus forest, but the species were different. One way in which the avifauna (local assortment of bird species) changes is that cavity-nesting birds including woodpeckers, owls, chickadees, wood ducks, etc. are depauperate in Eucalyptus groves because the decay-resistant wood of these trees prevents cavity formation by decay or excavation. Also, those bird species that glean insects from foliage, such as warblers and vireos, experience population declines when Eucalyptus groves replace oak forest.

Birds that thrive in Eucalyptus groves in California tend to prefer tall vertical habitat. These avian species include herons and egrets, which also nest in redwoods. The Point Reyes Bird Observatory observes that sometimes short-billed birds like the ruby-crowned kinglet are found dead beneath Eucalyptus trees with their nostrils clogged with pitch.

Monarch butterflies use Eucalyptus in California for overwintering, but in some locations have a preference for Monterey pines.

=== Eucalyptus as an invasive species ===
Eucalyptus trees are considered invasive to local ecosystems and negatively impact water resources in countries where they are introduced.

South Africa

In South Africa, Eucalyptus tree species E. camaldulensis, E. cladocalyx, E. conferruminata, E. diversicolor, E. grandis and E. tereticornis are listed as Category 1b invaders in the National Environmental Management: Biodiversity Act. This means most activities with regards to the species are prohibited (such as importing, propagating, translocating or trading) and it should be ensured that it does not spread beyond a plantation's domain.

E. cladocalyx and E. diversicolor are considered Fynbos invaders, and use up to 20% more water than the native fynbos vegetation; with invasive species including Eucalyptus being cleared that reduce Cape Town's water resource by 55 billion litres or two months worth of water supply.

== Artistic and musical references ==
Musical homage to Eucalyptus is particularly common in the species' native land, Australia. The award winning book "Eucalyptus", a love story set in the Australian Outback, was transformed by universally lauded Australian composer, Jonathan Millers, into an Opera bearing the same name. And the famous Australian children's song, "Kookaburra sits on the old gum tree", portrays a kingfisher bird singing in a "gum tree", which is a term for most trees in the Eucalypt category.

In Israel, A legendary song titled Chorshat Ha-Eucalyptus ("The Eucalyptus Grove") attests to the country's romantic attachment to the Eucalyptus tree. It was written by Naomi Shemer, Israel's most acclaimed songwriter.

== Photo album ==
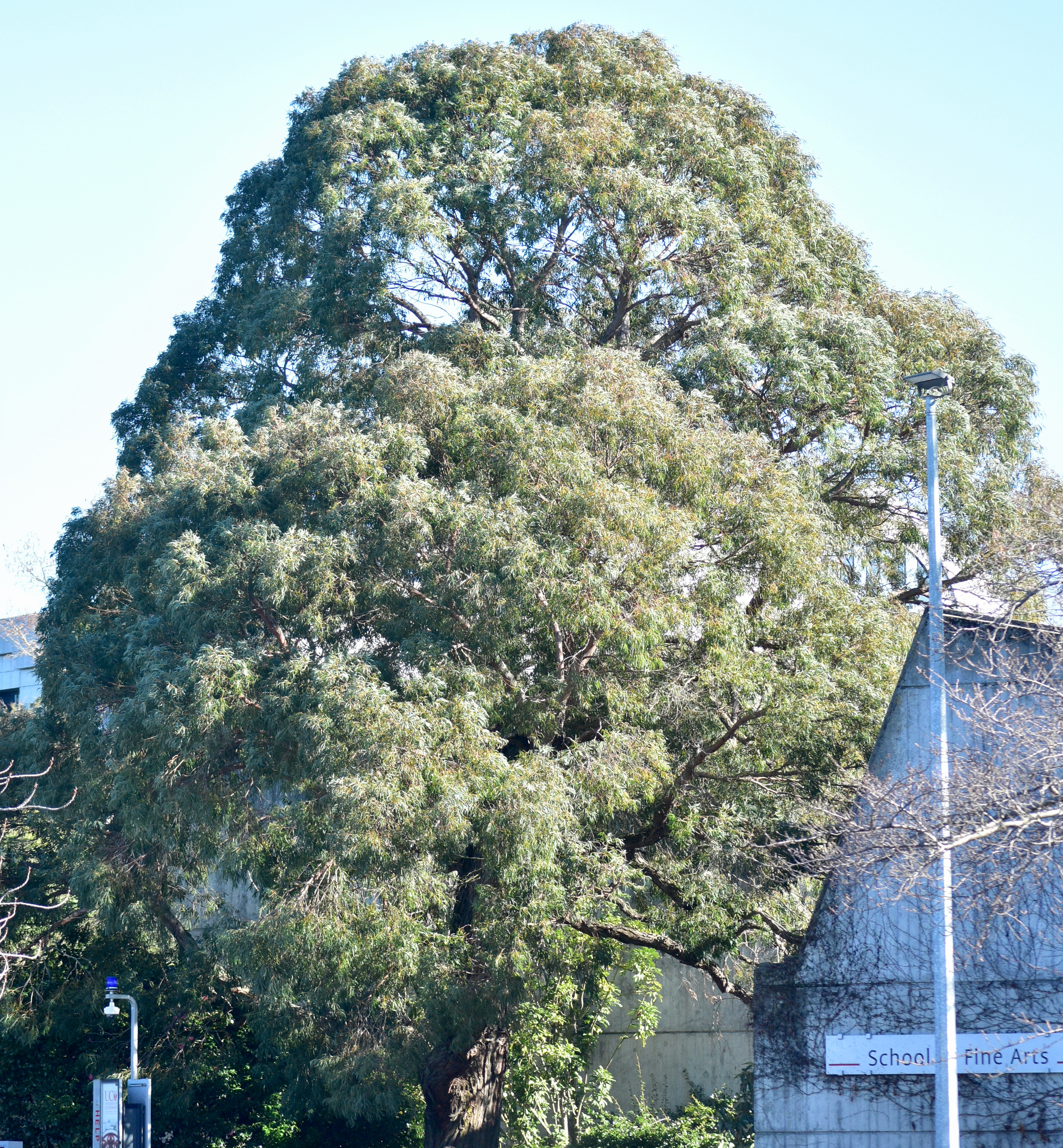
Mature Eucalyptus macarthurii, at the University of Canterbury

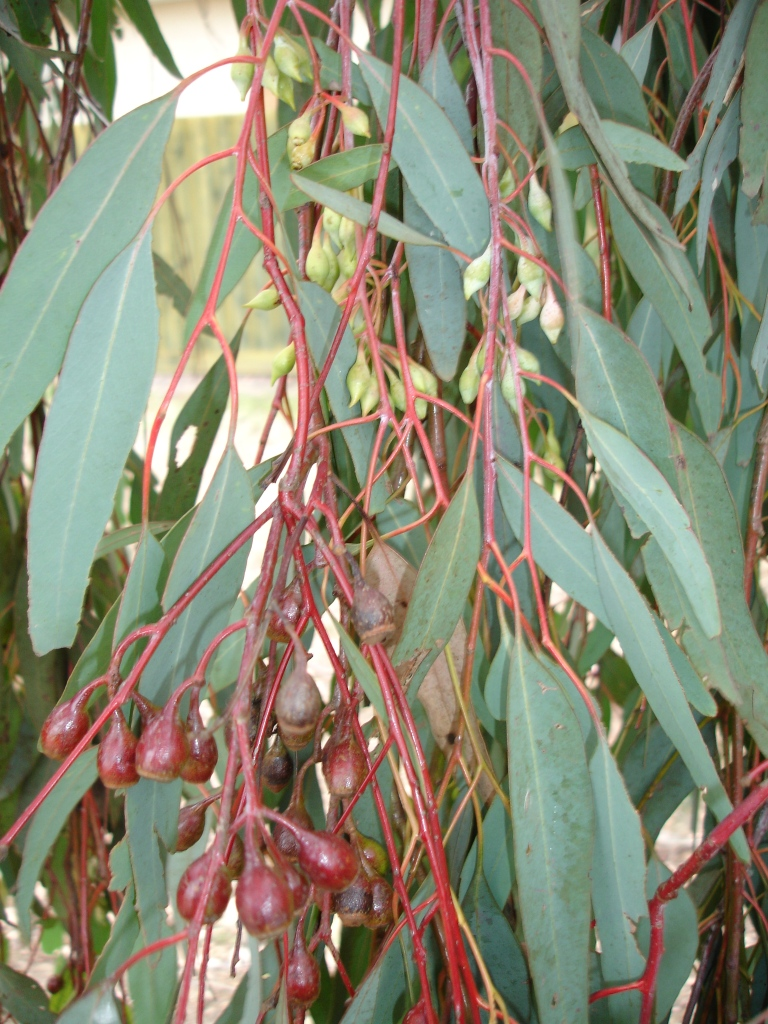
Eucalyptus sideroxylon, showing fruit (capsules) and buds with operculum present.

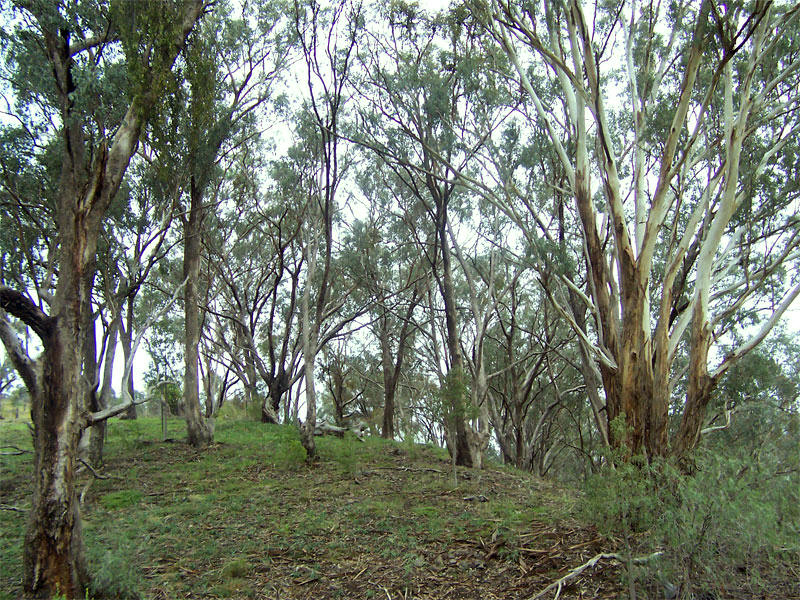
Eucalyptus forest in East Gippsland, Victoria. Mostly E. albens (white box).

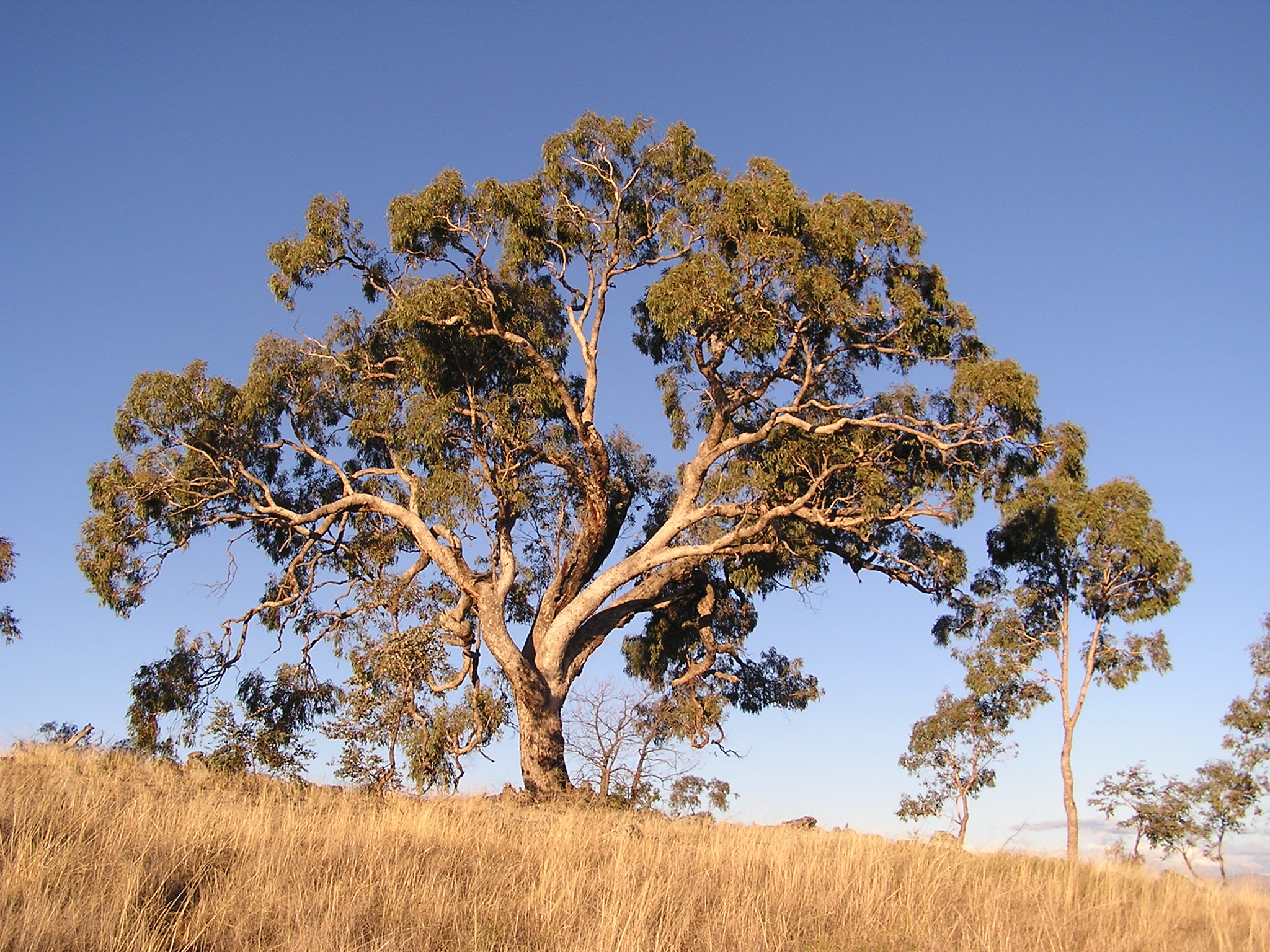
E. bridgesiana (apple box) on Red Hill, Australian Capital Territory.

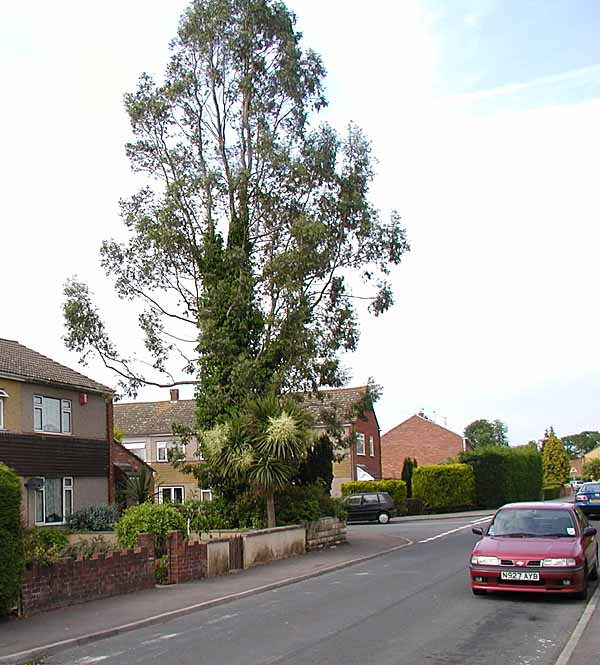
E. gunnii planted in southern England. The lower part of the trunk is covered in ivy.

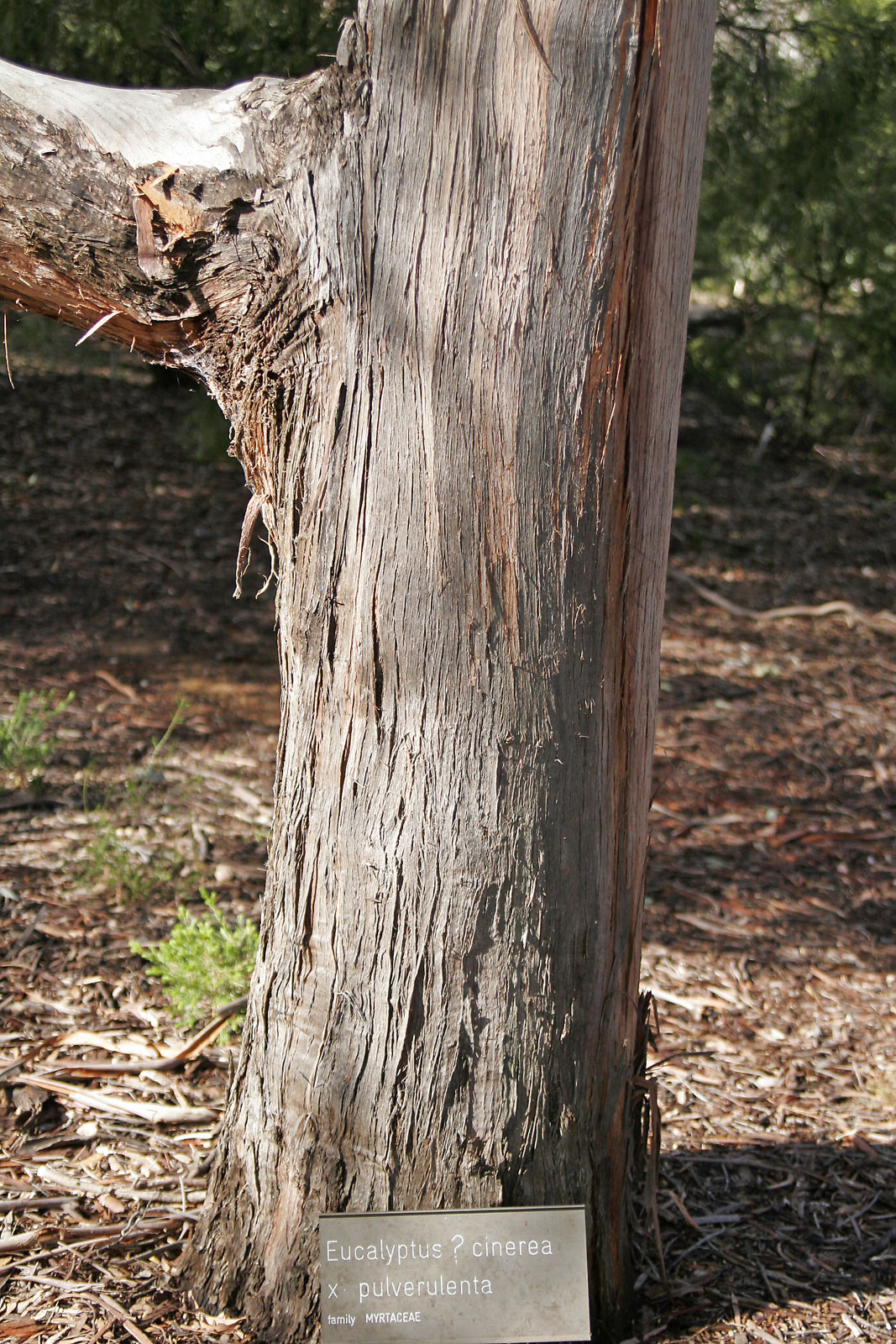
Eucalyptus cinerea x pulverulenta - National Botanical Gardens Canberra

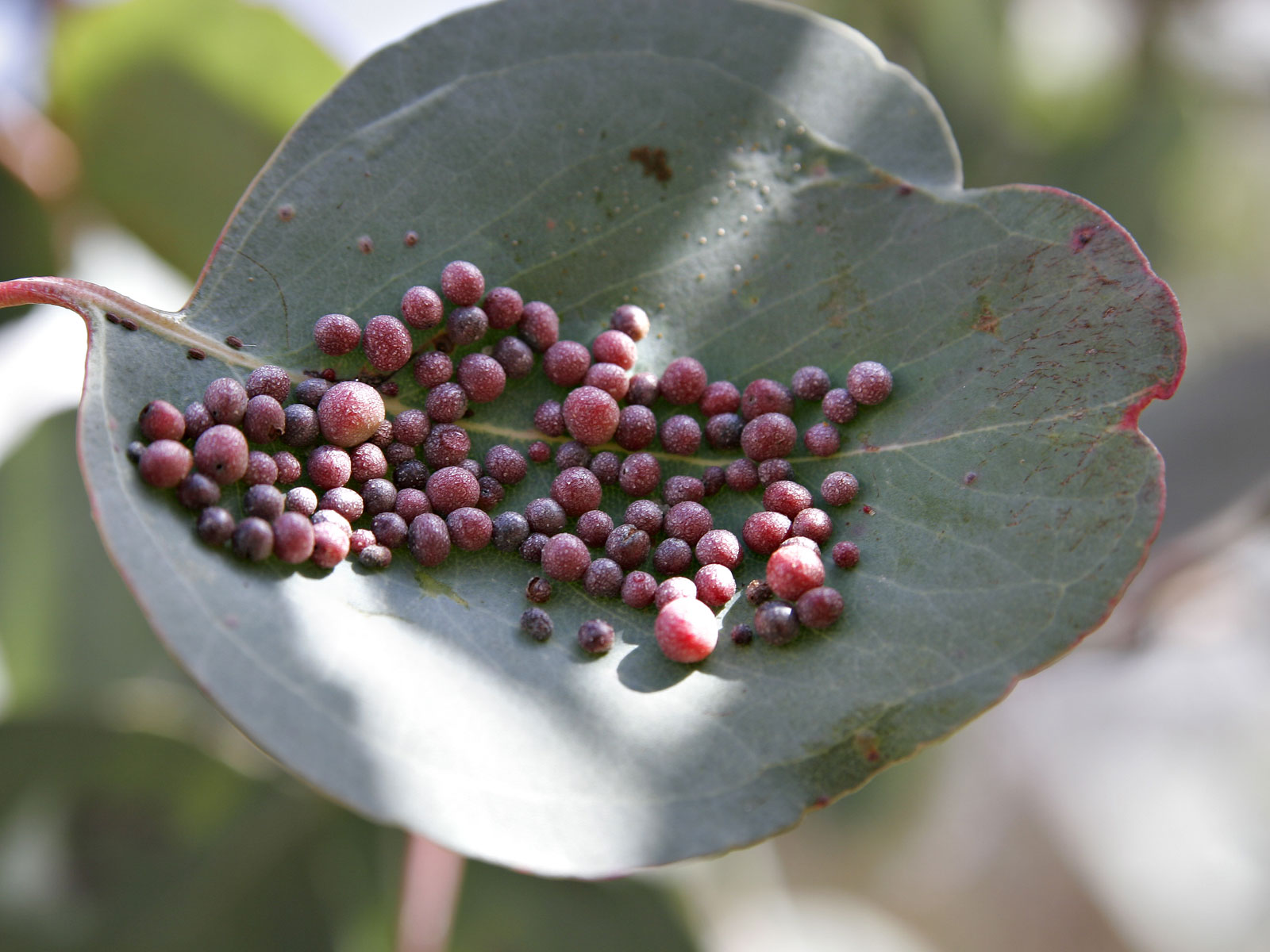
Eucalyptus gall

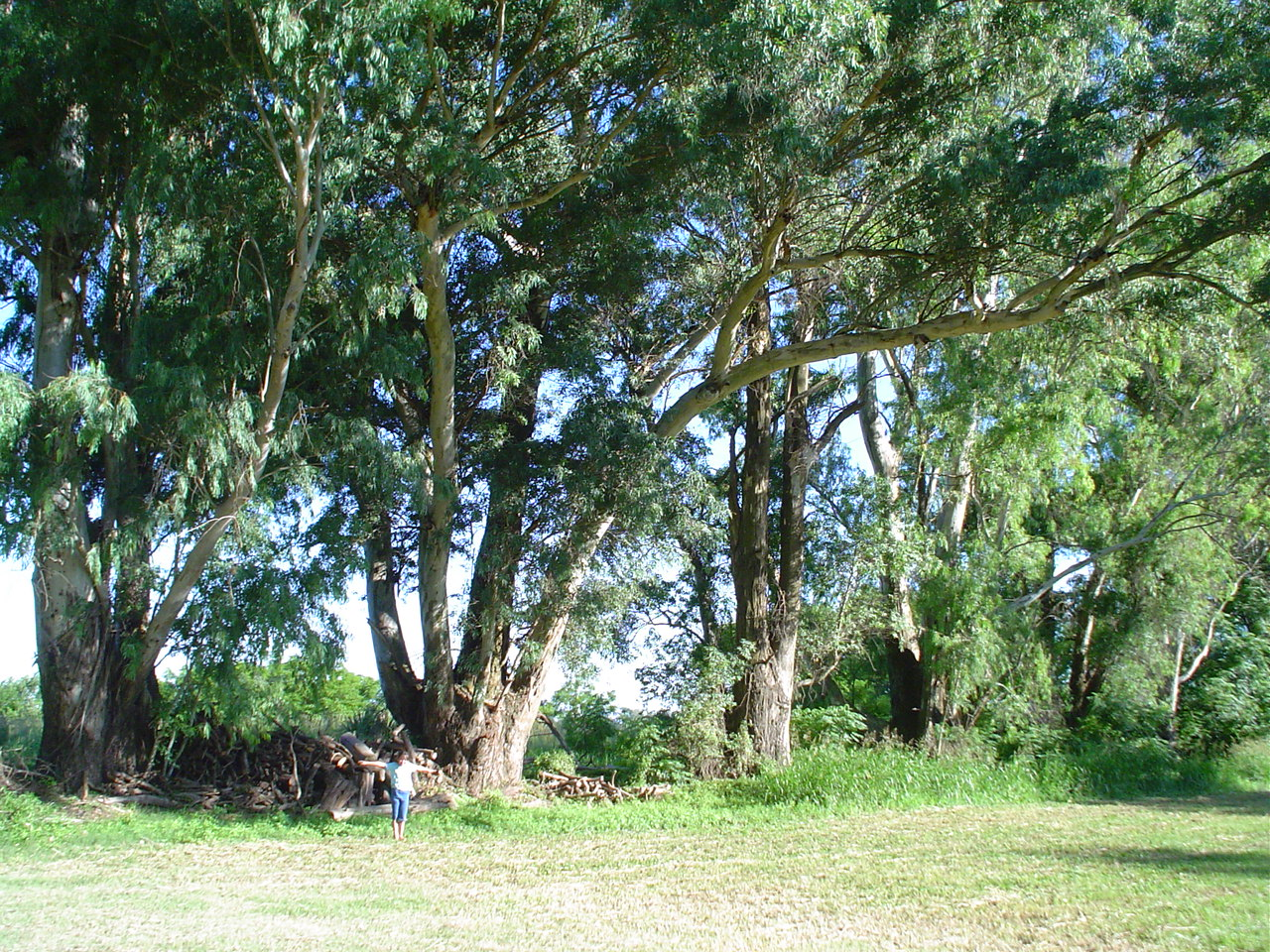
E. grandis. Province of Buenos Aires, Argentina.

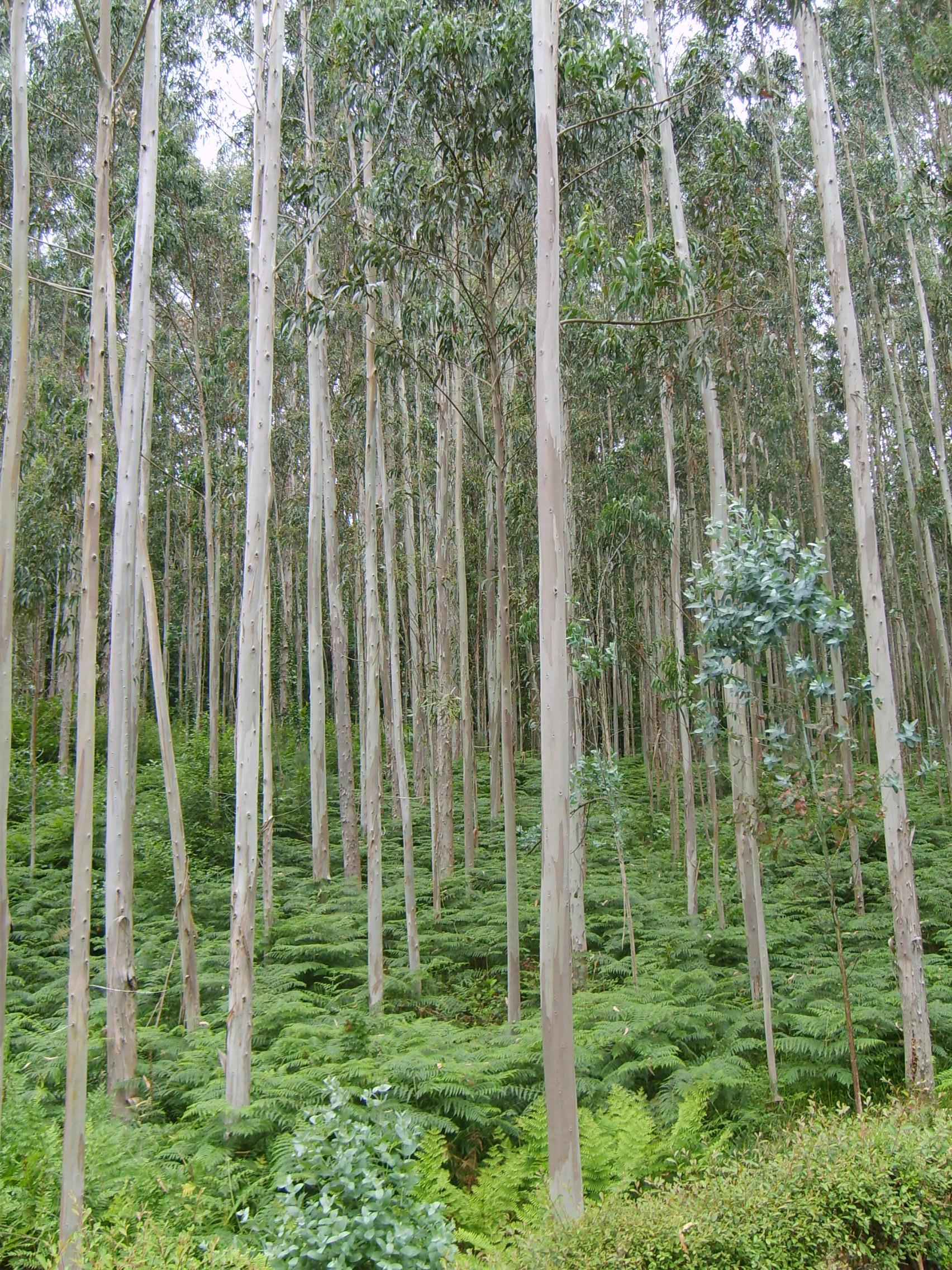
Eucalyptus plantation near Viveiro, in Galicia in Northwest Spain. Mostly E. globulus

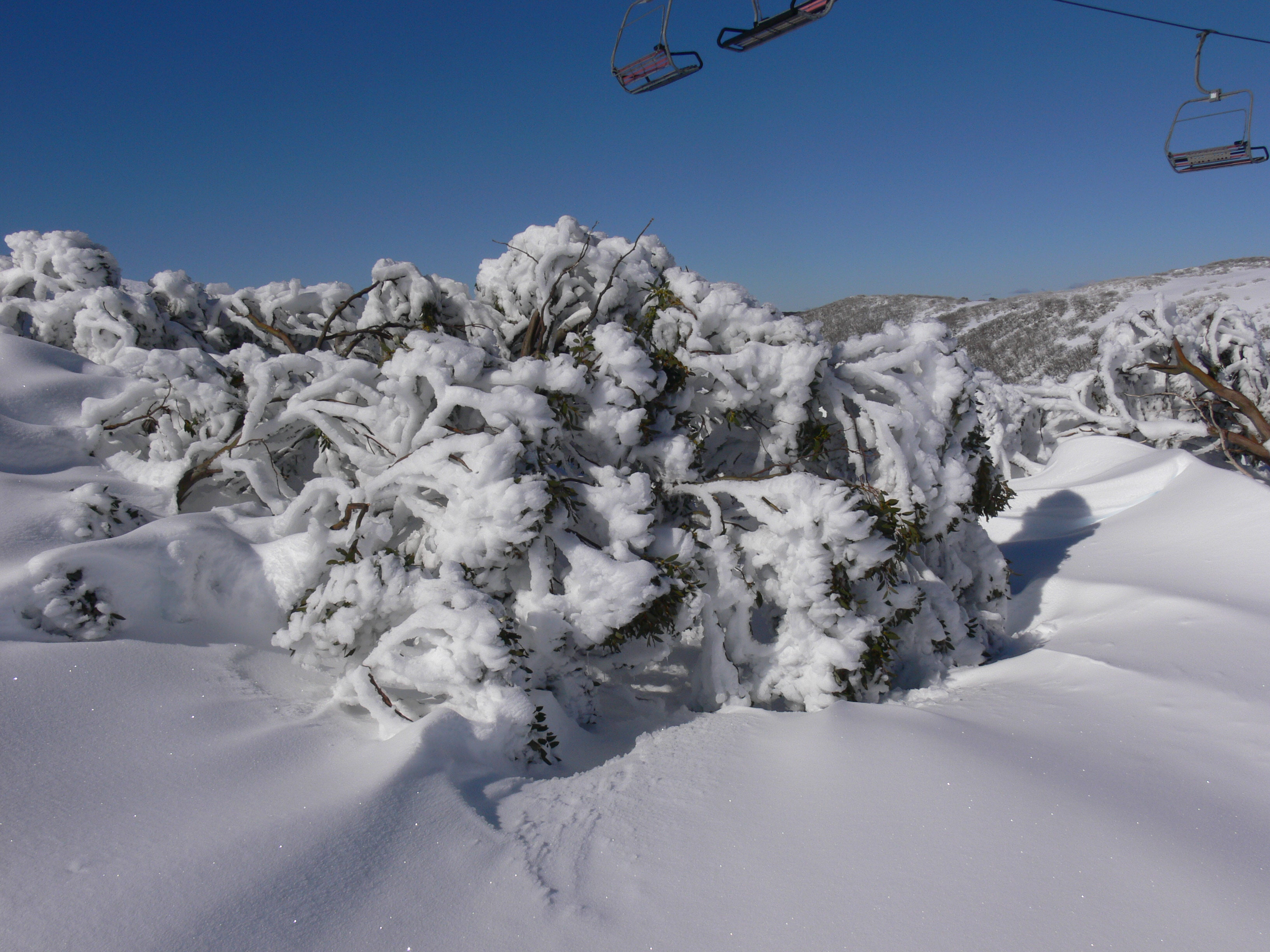
A snow gum (E. pauciflora), in winter in the Australian Alps

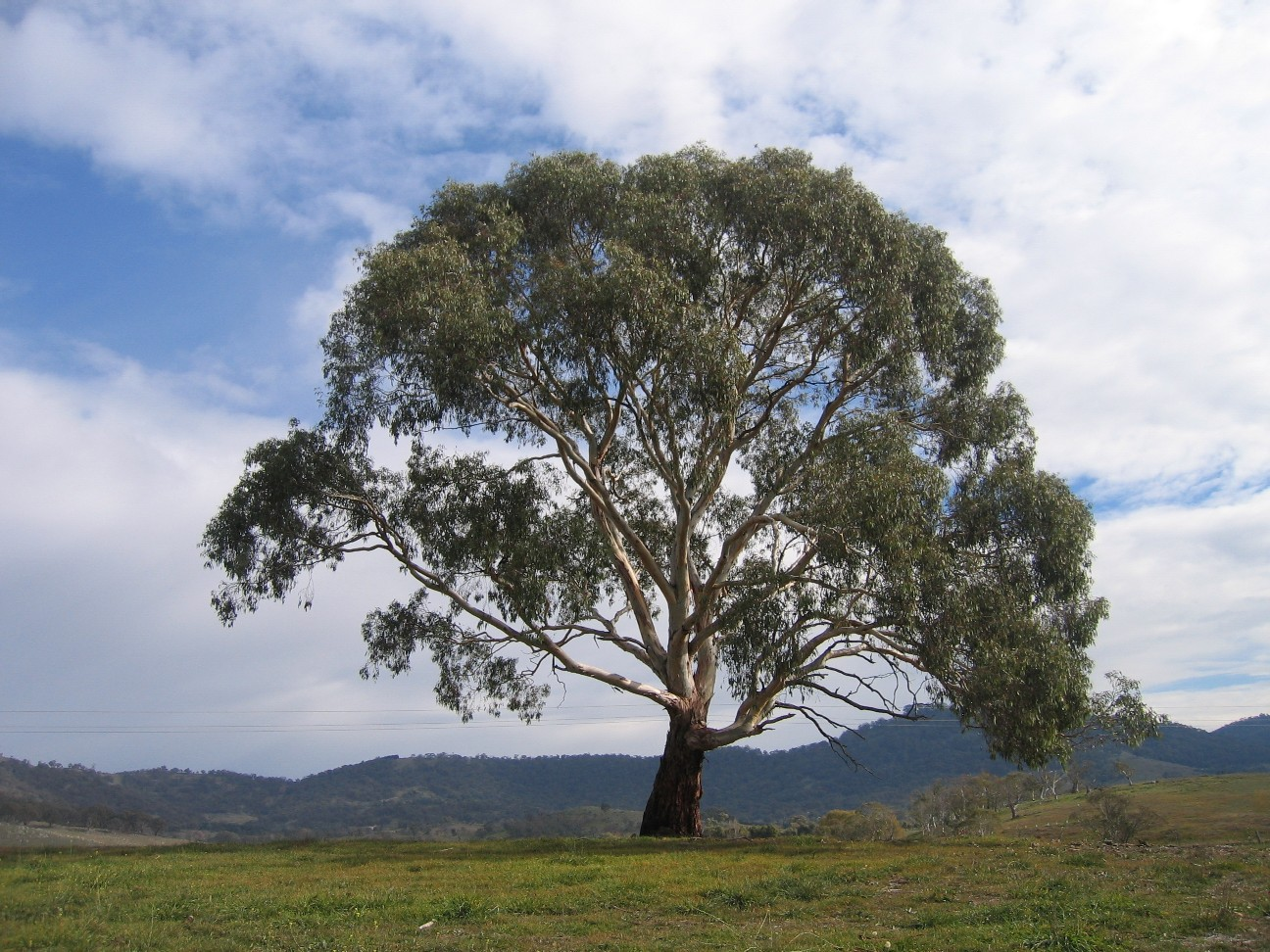
E. rubida (candlebark gum) in Burra, New South Wales.

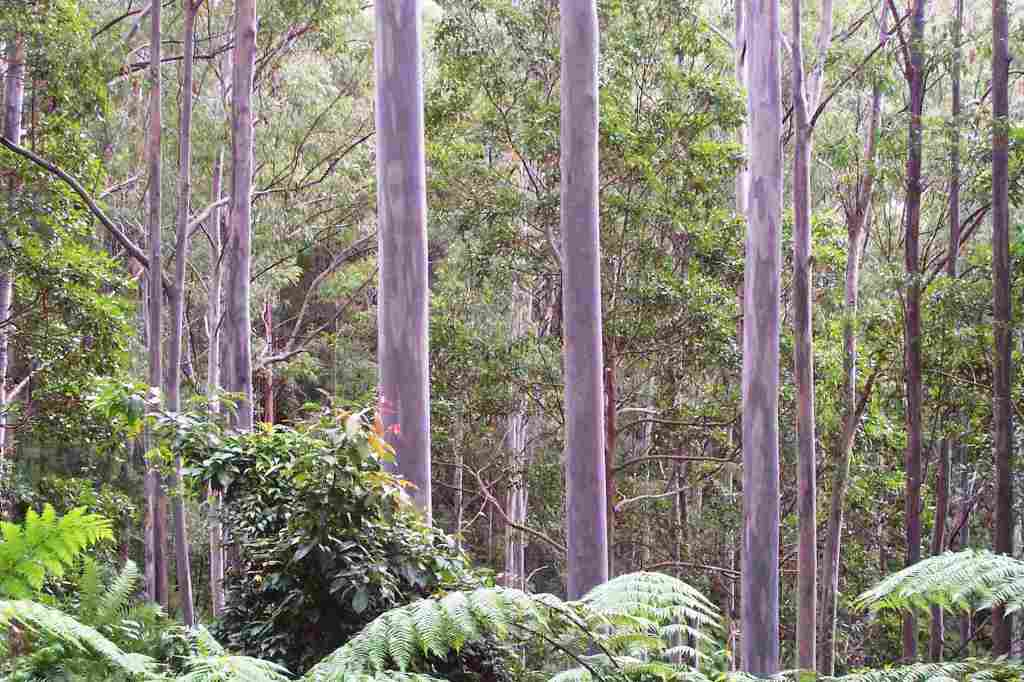
Sydney blue gums west of Port Macquarie, New South Wales

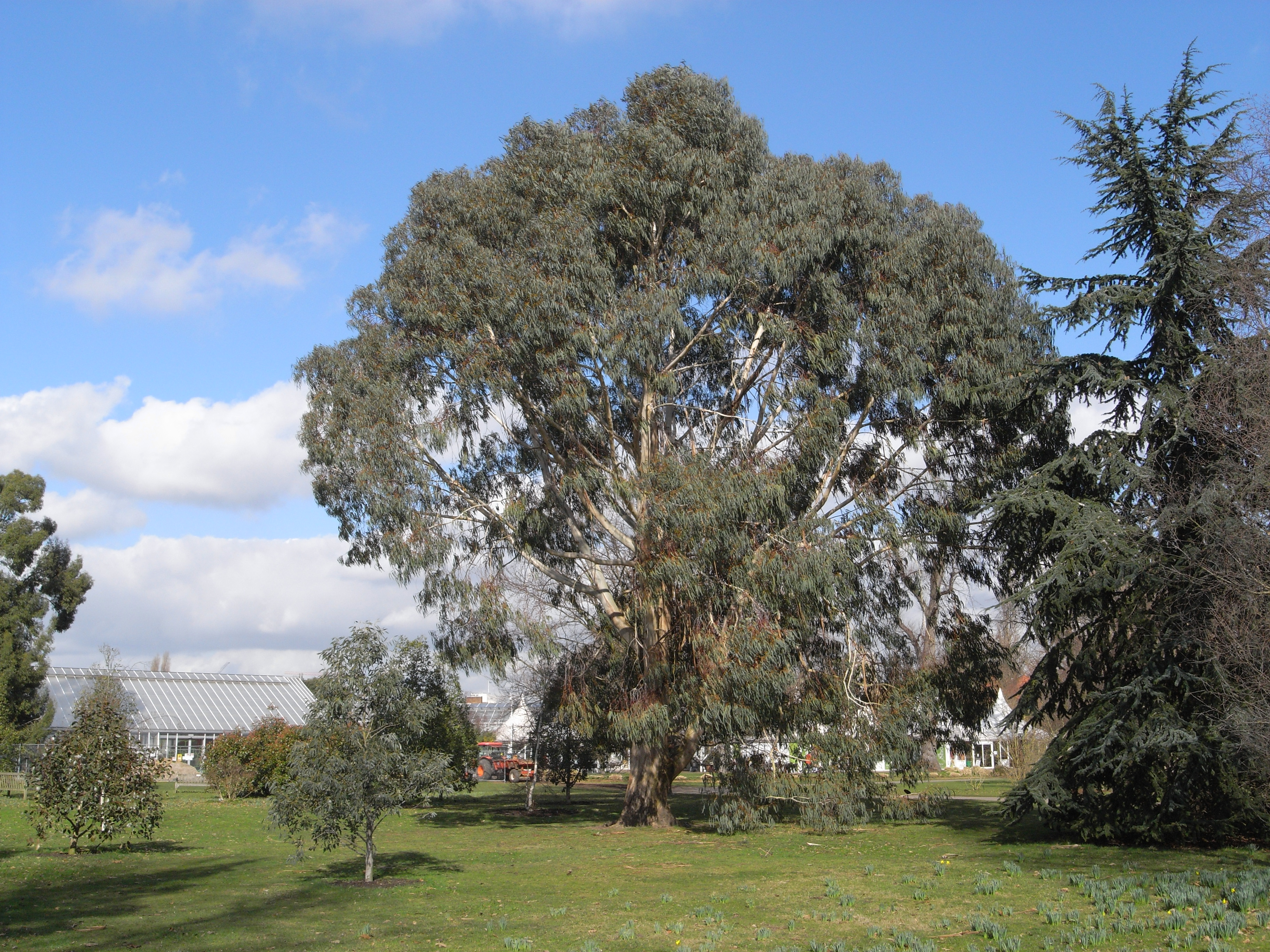
Eucalyptus chapmaniana (bogong gum) in Kew Gardens, London

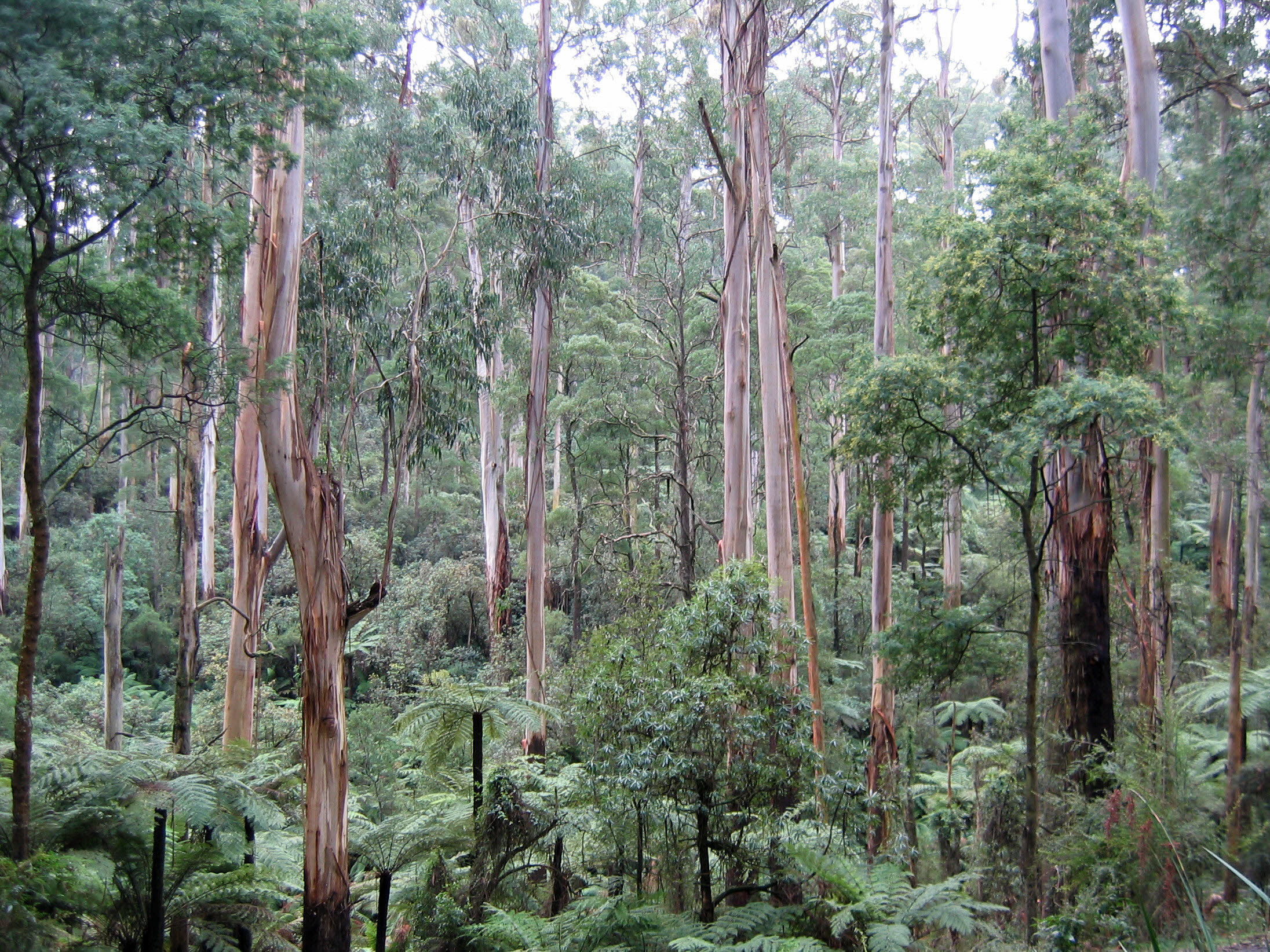
E. regnans trees in Sherbrooke Forest, Victoria

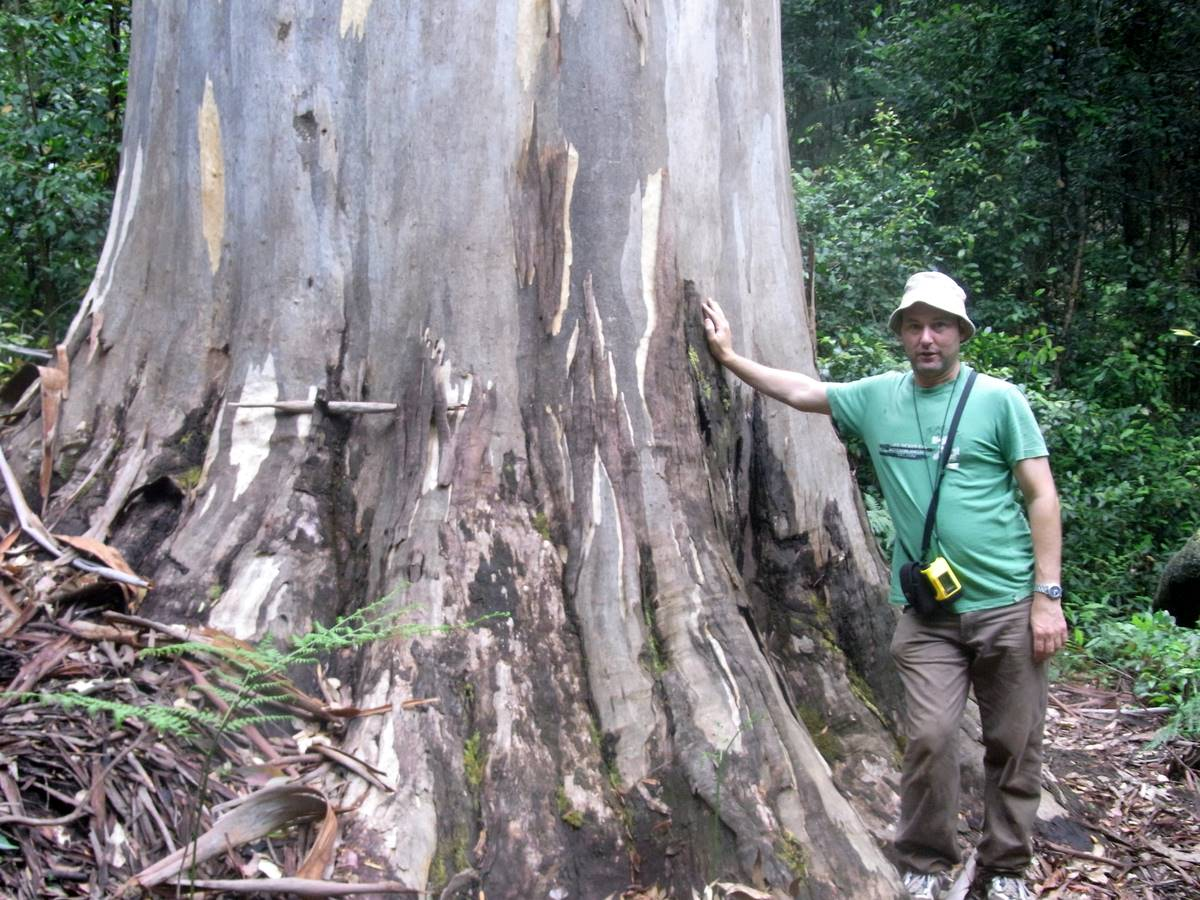
E. deanei, Blue Mountains National Park, Australia

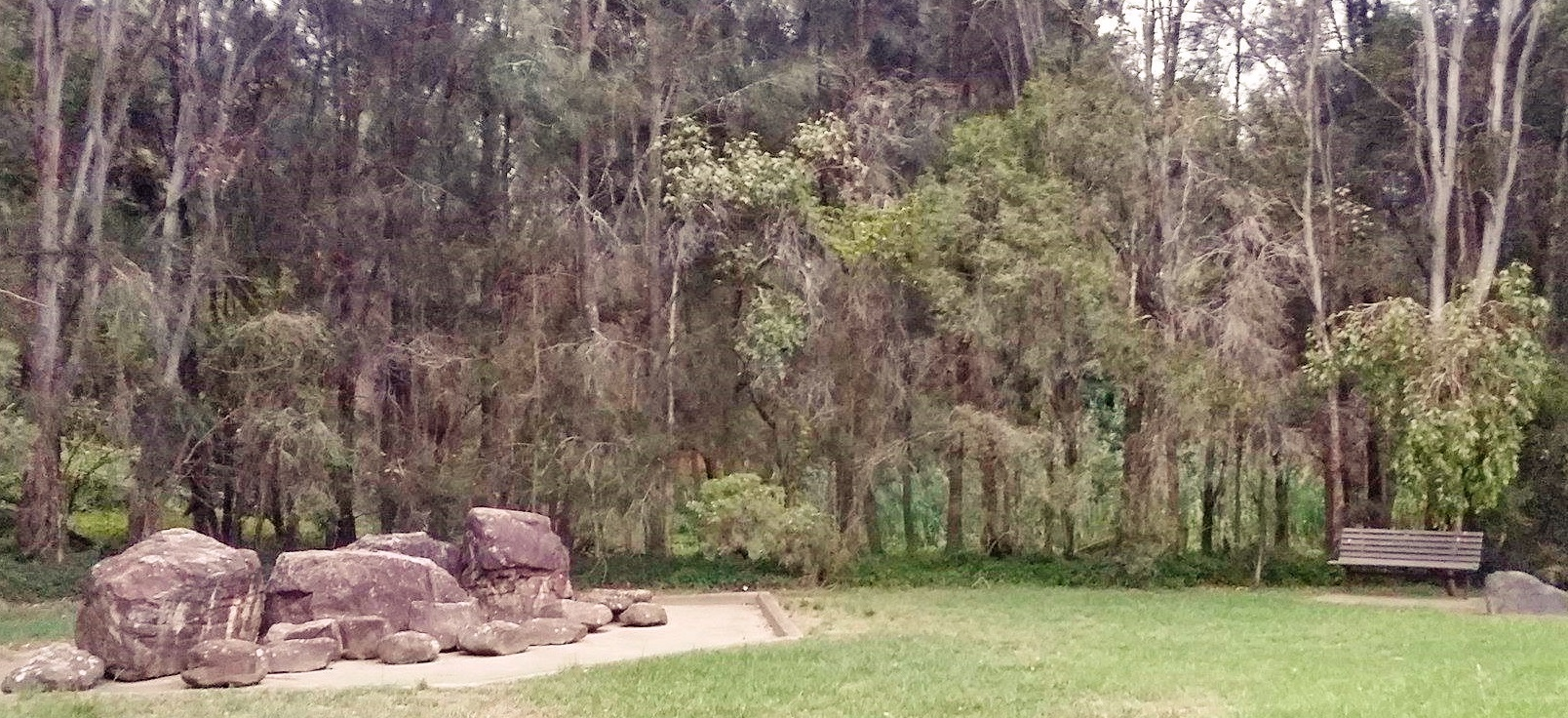
Eucalypt woodland area near Prospect Creek in western Sydney. Mostly E. amplifolia and E. tereticornis.
