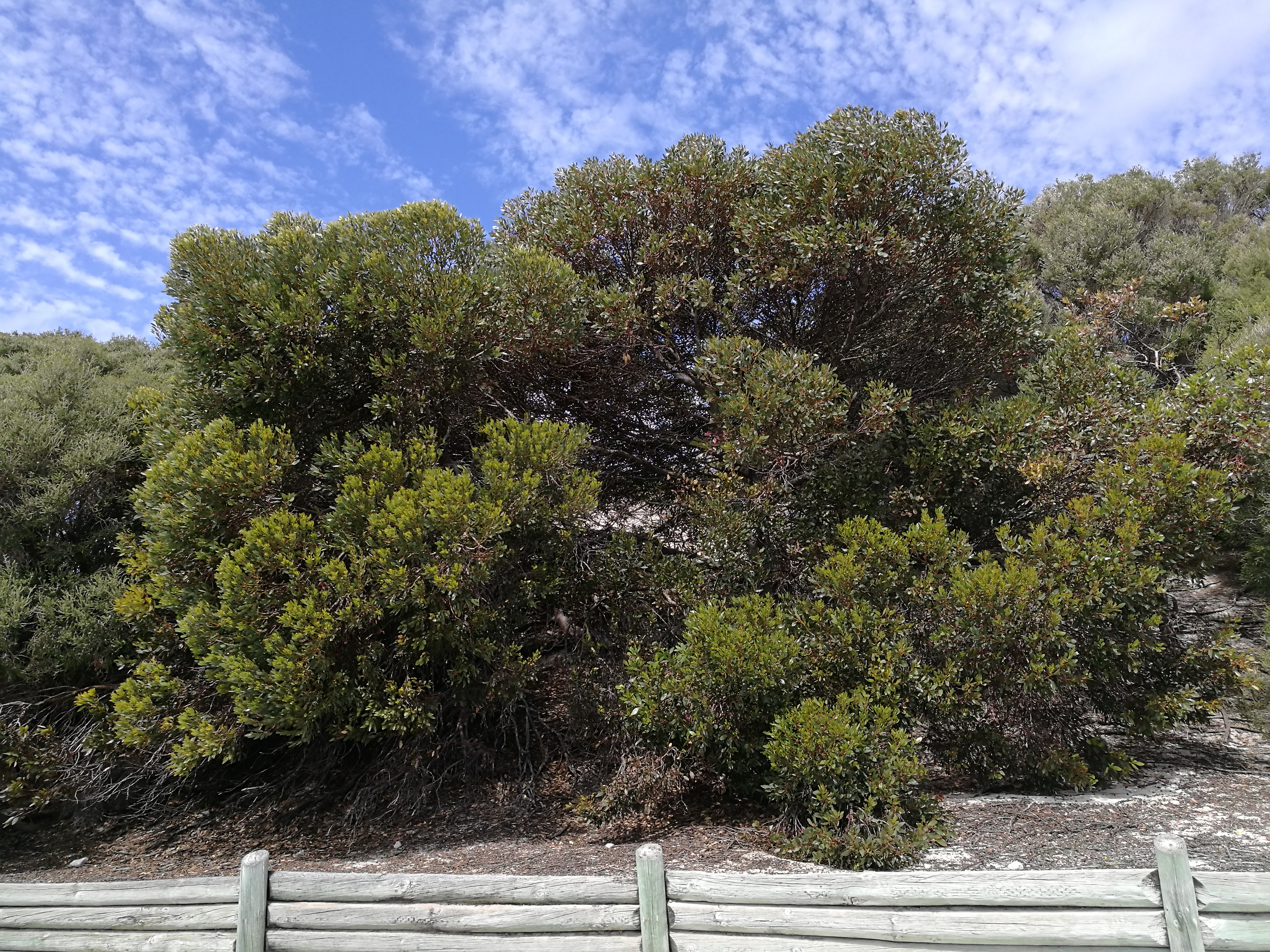
- Eucalyptus utilis (lower, green trees)
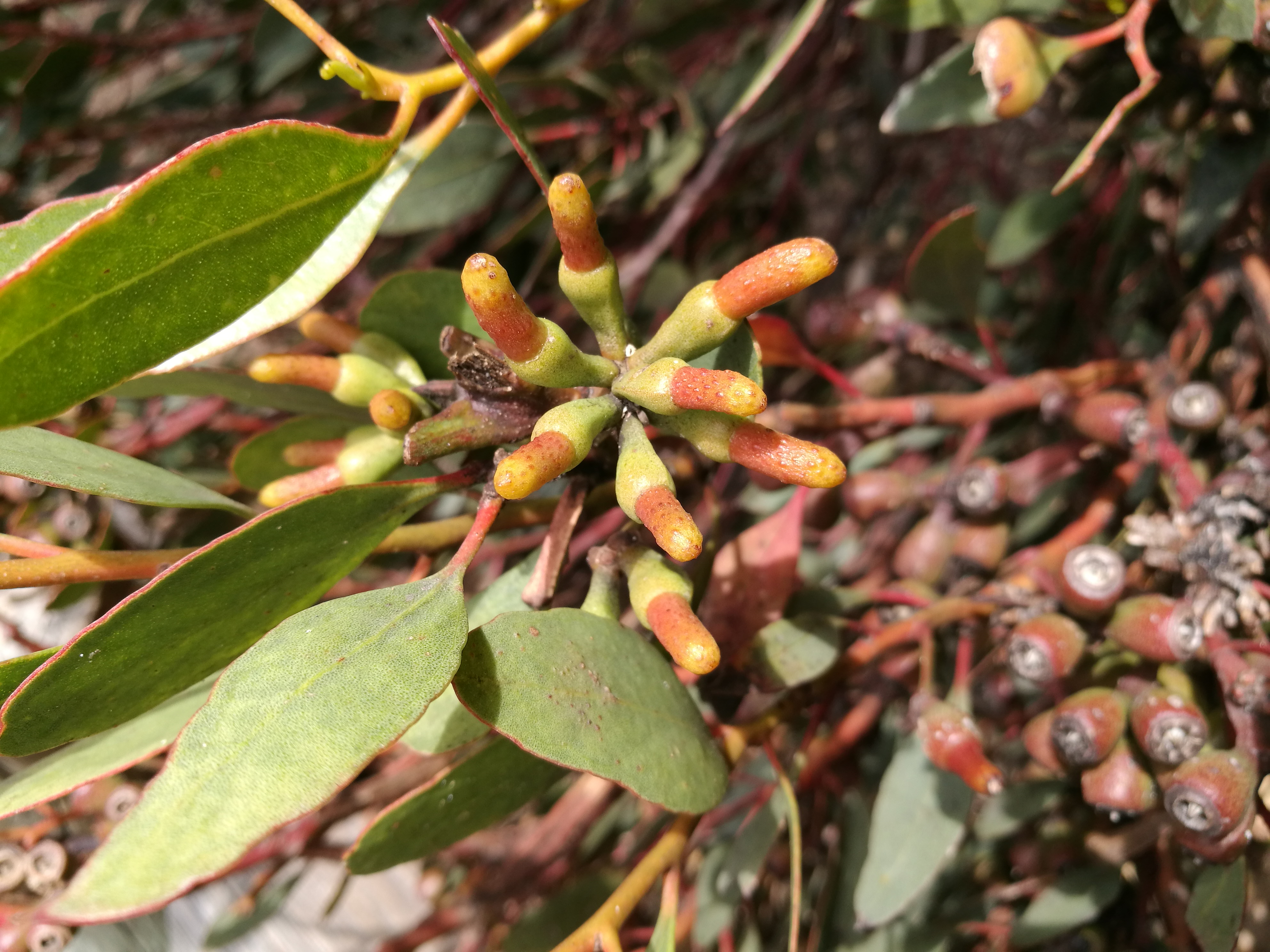
- Eucalyptus utilis (buds and fruit)

Scientific classification
- Kingdom: Plantae
- Clade: Tracheophytes
- Clade: Angiosperms
- Clade: Eudicots
- Clade: Rosids
- Order: Myrtales
- Family: Myrtaceae
- Genus: Eucalyptus
- Species: E. utilis

Binomial name
- Eucalyptus utilis Brooker & Hopper
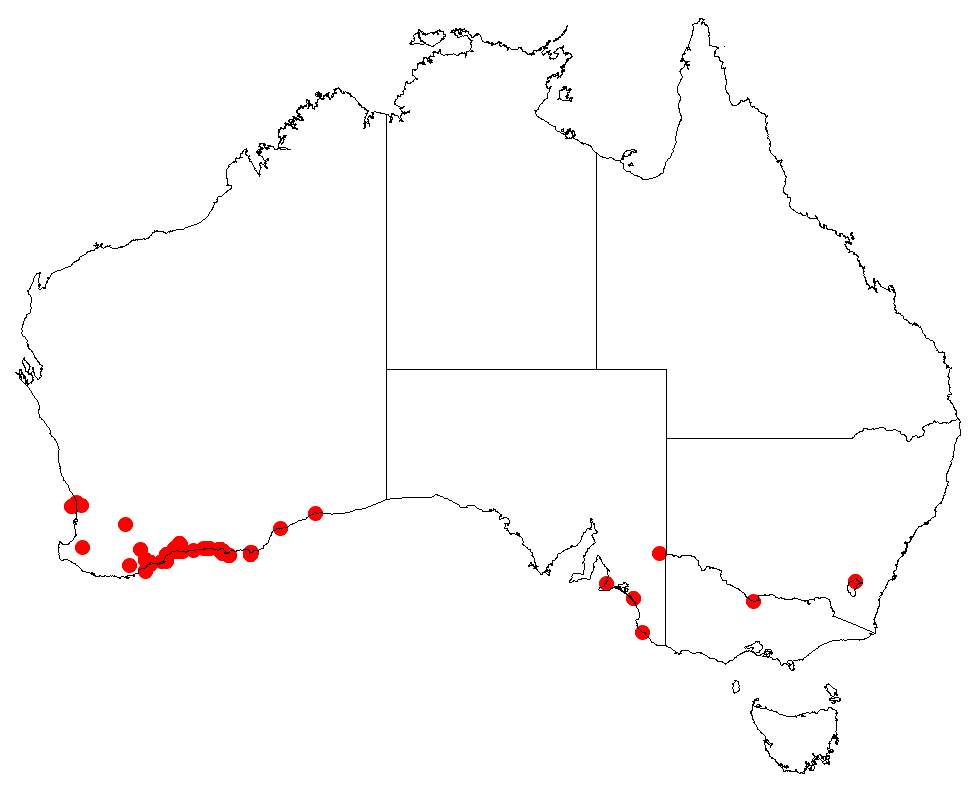
- Occurrence data from AVH

Synonyms
- Eucalyptus platypus var. heterophylla auct. non Blakely: Chippend.

= Eucalyptus utilis =

Coastal moort

Species of eucalyptus

Eucalyptus utilis, commonly known as coastal moort or coastal mort, is a species of mallet or mallee that is native to southern areas of Western Australia. It has smooth bark, egg-shaped to lance-shaped adult leaves, flower buds in group or seven, creamy white flowers and conical fruit.

== Description ==
Eucalyptus utilis is a mallet or mallee that typically grows to a height of 1.5–15 m (4 ft 11 in – 49 ft 3 in) and has a spreading habit. There is doubt about whether or not the species forms a lignotuber. (A mallee has a lignotuber but a mallet does not.) It has a short trunk with smooth grey bark that peels off in ribbons revealing smooth pale brown bark underneath. The crown is relatively close to the ground, dense and spreading. Young plants have green to greyish, egg-shaped leaves that are 20–80 mm (0.79–3.15 in) long and 15–35 mm (0.59–1.38 in) wide. Adult leaves are thick, the same shade of glossy olive green on both sides, egg-shaped to lance-shaped, 45–80 mm (1.8–3.1 in) long and 10–40 mm (0.39–1.57 in) wide, tapering to a petiole 8–20 mm (0.31–0.79 in) long.

The flower buds are arranged in leaf axil in groups of seven on a flattened, unbranched peduncle 13–33 mm (0.51–1.30 in) long, the individual buds sessile or on pedicels up to 5 mm (0.20 in) long. Mature buds have an elongated ovoid shape and are 12–28 mm (0.47–1.10 in) in length and 4–7 mm (0.16–0.28 in) wide with a horn-shaped operculum that is up to 2.5 times as long as the floral cup. Flowering occurs from September to January and the flowers are creamy white. The fruit is a woody, conical to almost barrel-shaped capsule 8–13 mm (0.31–0.51 in) long and 7–10 mm (0.28–0.39 in) wide on down-turned to spreading peduncles. There is a descending disc and three to four valves at rim level. The seeds are oval, black to brown and 7–20 mm (0.28–0.79 in) long.

Eucalyptus utilis can be distinguished from E. platypus by its narrower, more lanceolate leaves, its erect bud clusters and coastal sand-dune habitat, rather than growing on heavy soil flats. E. utilis seems to be either mallee or mallet in habit whilst E. platypus is always a mallet. Eucalyptus nutans has a similar habit, similar adult leaves and similar erect staminal arrangement to E. utilis but differs in that its buds have a much shorter operculum, its flowers are red/pink and its fruit has five or six valves. Eucalyptus cernua and E. vesiculosa differ from E. utilis in having inflexed, not erect, stamens in bud, down-turned bud clusters and short rounded opercula, not long and horn-shaped.

== Taxonomy ==
Eucalyptus utilis was first formally described by the botanists Ian Brooker and Stephen Hopper in 2002 in the journal Nuytsia from specimens collected by Charles Austin Gardner near Hopetoun in 1964.

Brooker and Hopper considered the type specimens of Eucalyptus platypus var. heterophylla to be a hybrid between E. platypus subsp. platypus and E. spathulata. They also noted that populations attributed to E. platypus var. heterophylla did not occur anywhere near the type specimens. Brooker and Hopper consider those populations to be of the newly described E. utilis, and that interpretation is accepted by the Australian Plant Census.

The specific epithet is from the Latin word utilis meaning useful which refers to the many uses of the tree in street and farm plantings.

== Distribution ==
Coastal moort is found along the west and south coast of Western Australia, as far north as around Perth with the bulk of the population between Fitzgerald River National Park then east to around Esperance with scattered populations found further east. Populations are also found on islands in the Recherche Archipelago including Middle and Mondrain Island. It grows in a variety of habitats, including on sand dunes, on and around granite hills, and near swamps and estuaries, growing in sandy or clay soils. It is native in parts of its range and naturalised elsewhere.

== Conservation status ==
This eucalypt is classified as "not threatened" by the Western Australian Government Department of Parks and Wildlife.

== Use in horticulture ==
This eucalypt is commercially available for cultivation and is commonly used for ornamental, windbreaks and shelter-belts. It is drought tolerant and moderately frost tolerant, can grow in poor sandy soils that are alkaline and is semi-salt tolerant. It produces a good amount of pollen and nectar and makes good habitat for birds and insects.

== See also ==
- List of Eucalyptus species
