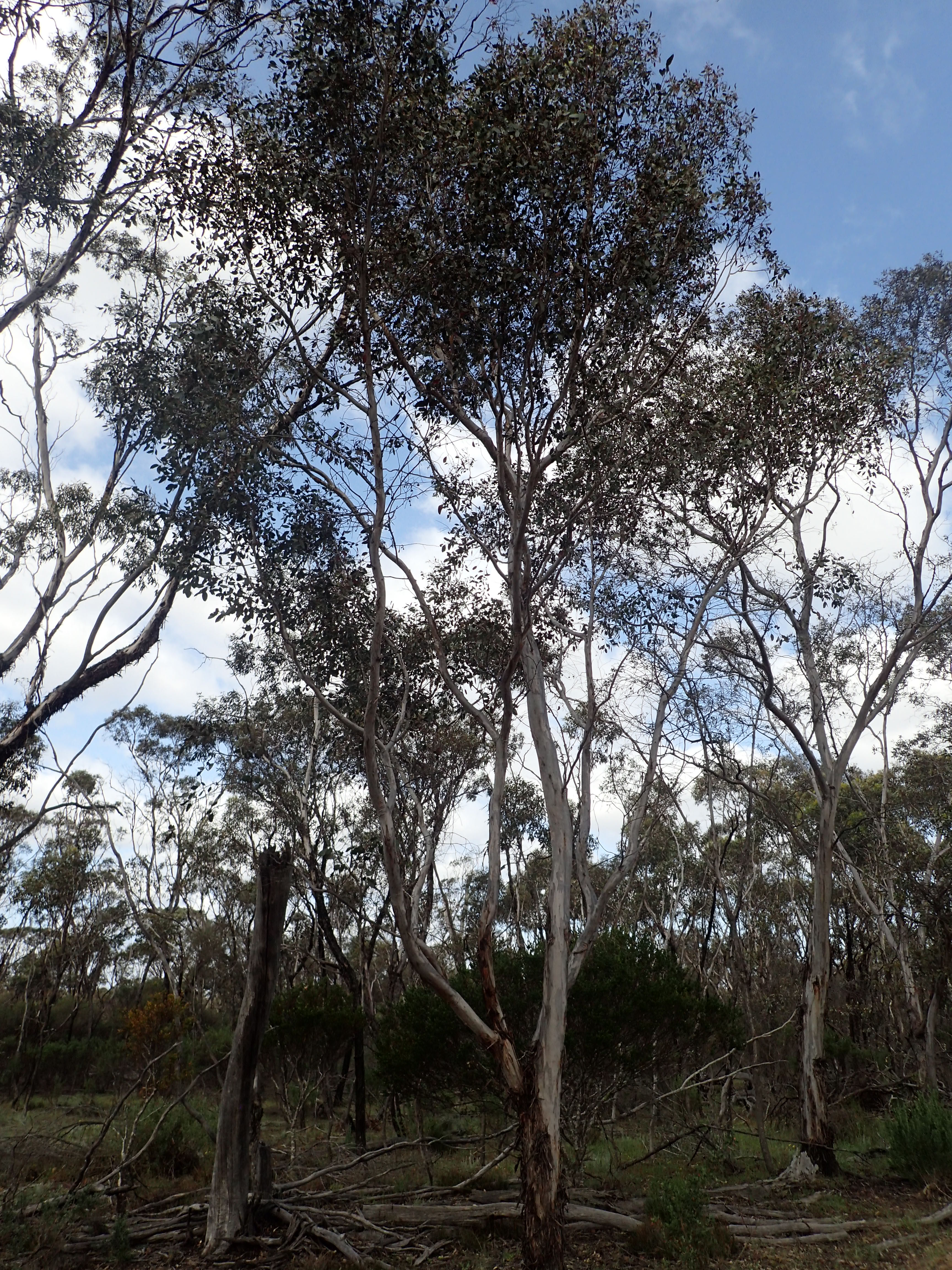
- Habit near Jerramungup

Conservation status
- Data Deficient (IUCN 3.1)

- Priority One — Poorly Known Taxa (DEC)

Scientific classification
- Kingdom: Plantae
- Clade: Tracheophytes
- Clade: Angiosperms
- Clade: Eudicots
- Clade: Rosids
- Order: Myrtales
- Family: Myrtaceae
- Genus: Eucalyptus
- Species: E. calyerup

Binomial name
- Eucalyptus calyerup McQuoid & Hopper

= Eucalyptus calyerup =

Species of eucalyptus

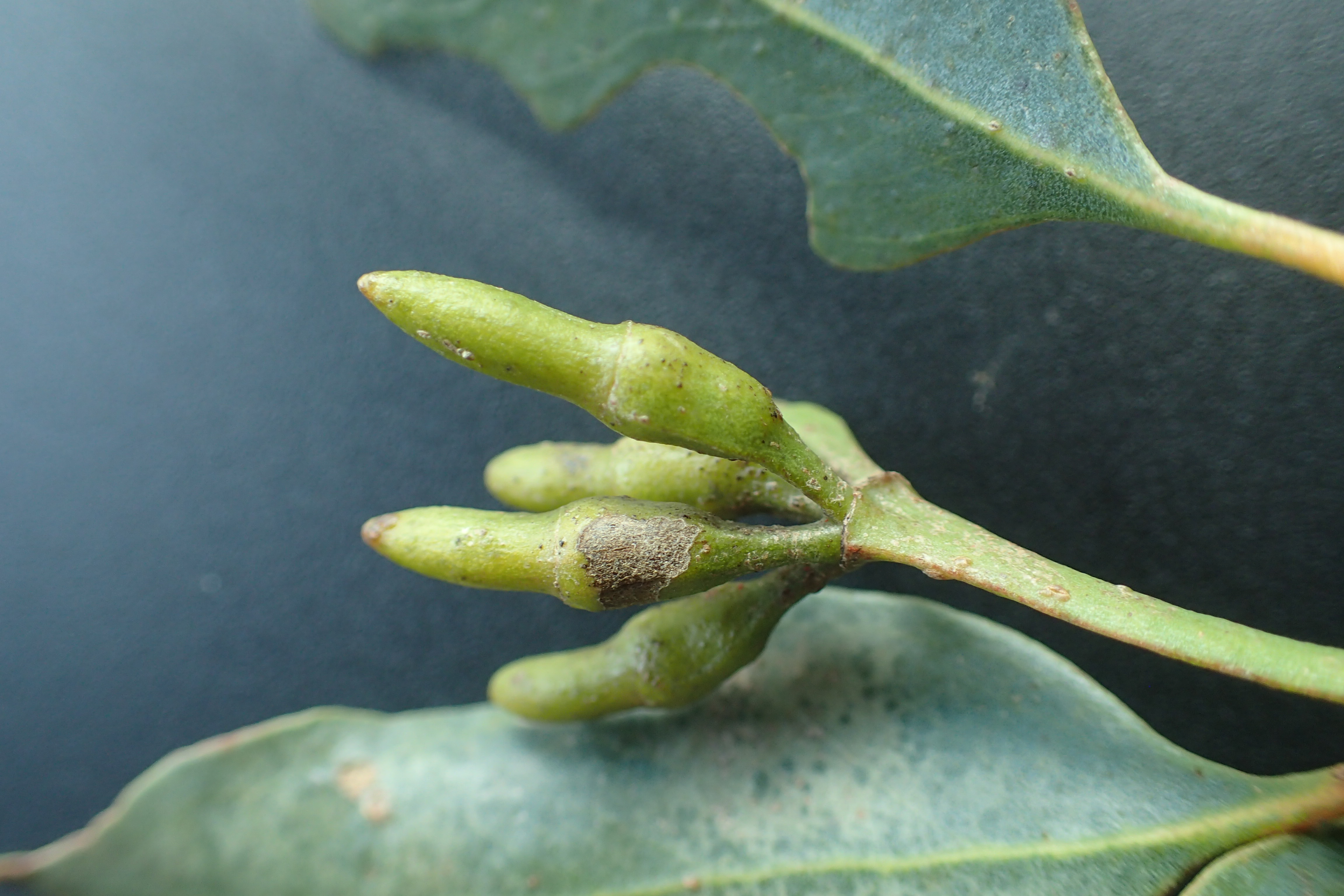
Flower buds

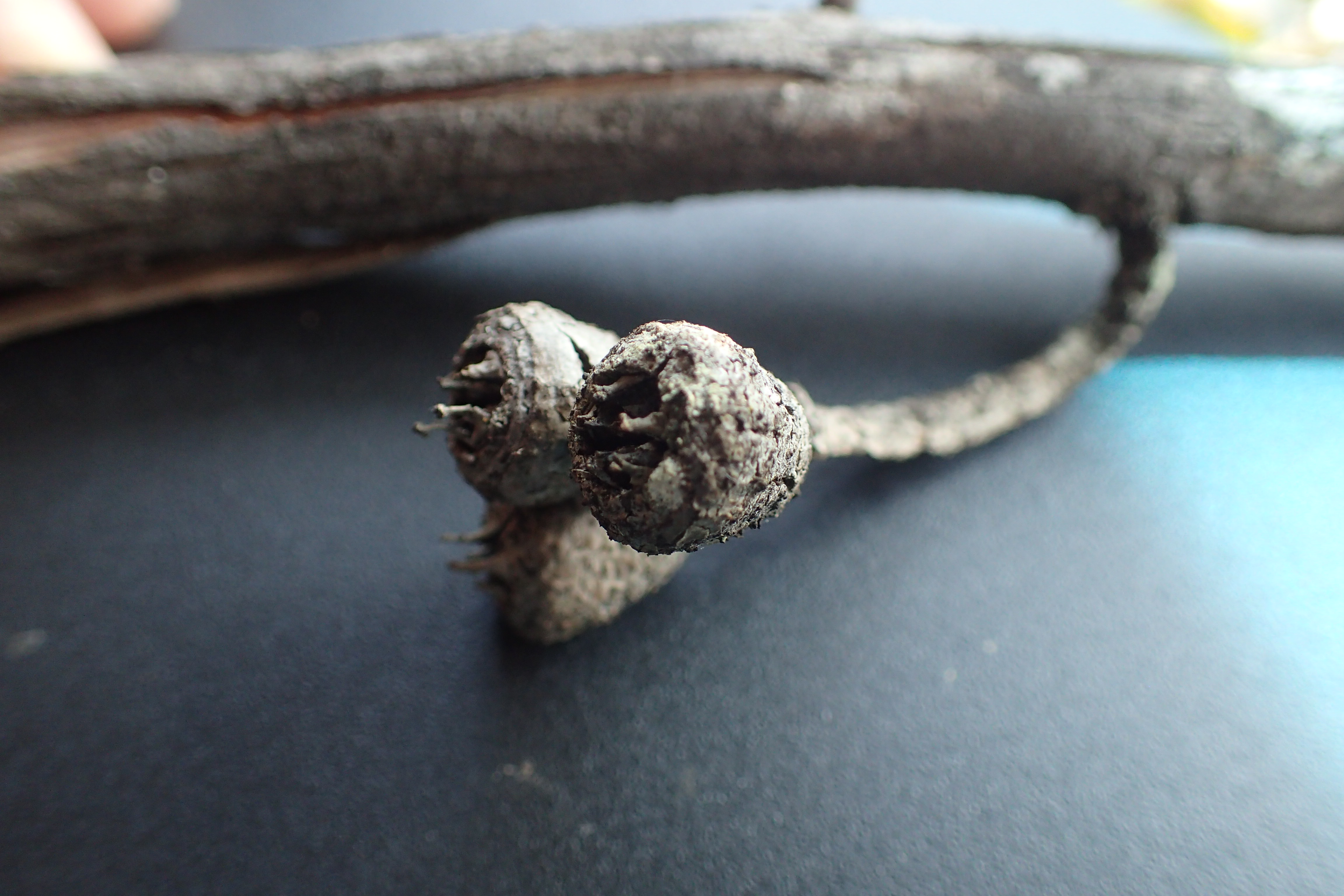
Fruit

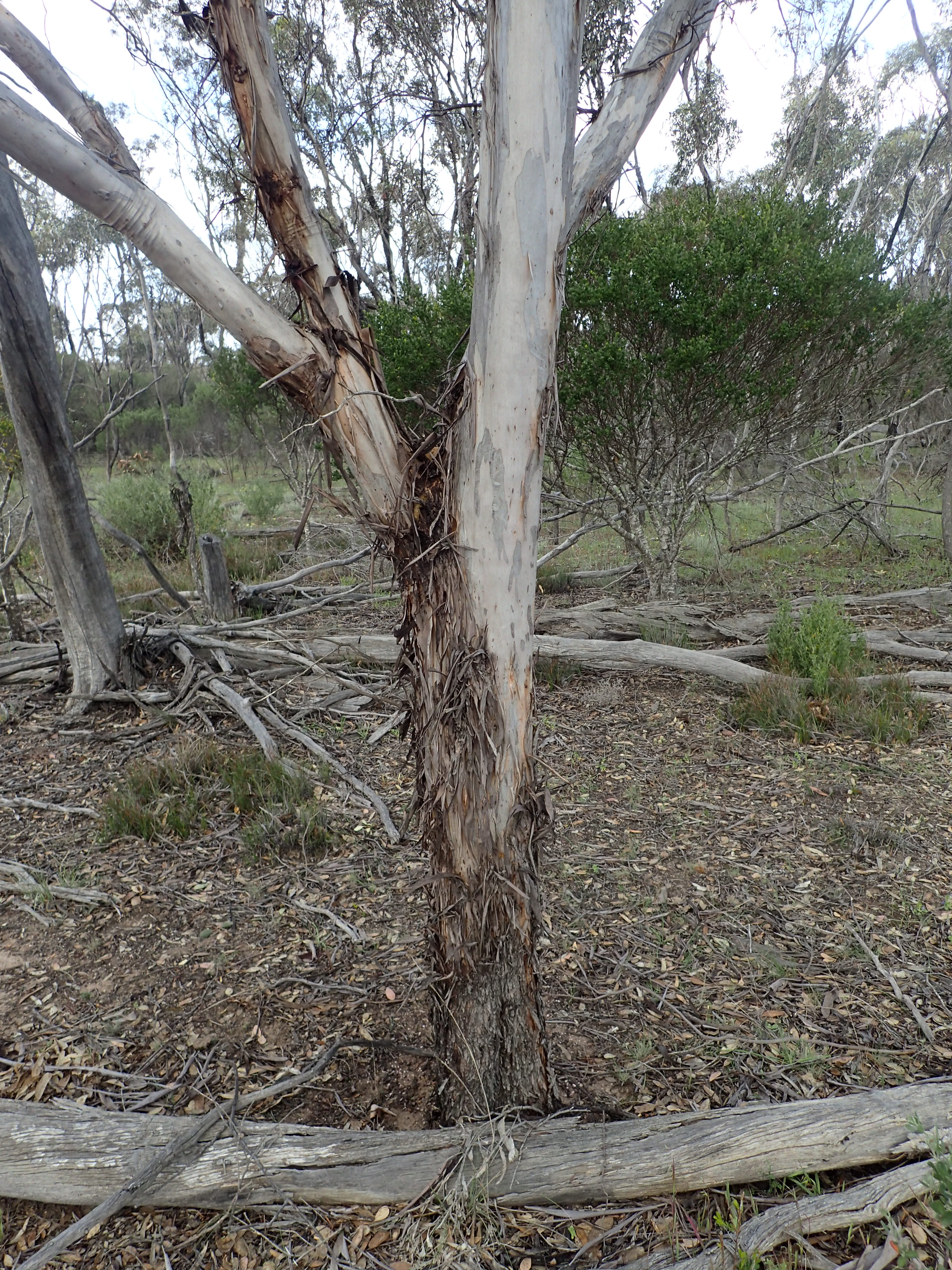
Bark

Eucalyptus calyerup is a tree that is endemic to a small area in the south-west of Western Australia. It has rough, fibrous bark on the lower part of the trunk, smooth bark above, elliptic to lance-shaped adult leaves, flower buds in groups of seven, creamy-yellow flowers and conical to bell-shaped fruit.

== Description ==
Eucalyptus calyerup is a tree that typically grows to a height of 10 metres (33 ft) and rarely forms a lignotuber. It has smooth pale cream to pale pink bark above a dark grey stocking of rough bark on the lowest 70 cm (28 in) of the trunk. Young plants have leaves that are bluish green, egg-shaped, 45–60 mm (1.8–2.4 in) long and 30–40 mm (1.2–1.6 in) wide. Adult leaves are egg-shaped to elliptic, sometimes lance-shaped, the same glossy green on both sides, 38–77 mm (1.5–3.0 in) long and 15–40 mm (0.59–1.57 in) wide on a petiole 5–15 mm (0.20–0.59 in) long. The flower buds are arranged in groups of seven in leaf axils on a flattened peduncle 20–35 mm (0.79–1.38 in) long, the individual flowers on a pedicel 2–4 mm (0.079–0.157 in) long. Mature buds are 20–33 mm (0.79–1.30 in) long, 6–8 mm (0.24–0.31 in) wide with a horn-shaped operculum that is narrower than, but about twice as long as the floral cup. Flowering occurs between October and December and the flowers are creamy yellow. The fruit is a woody, conical to bell-shaped capsule 8–14 mm (0.31–0.55 in) long and 8–12 mm (0.31–0.47 in) wide on a pedicel 2–3 mm (0.079–0.118 in) long.

== Taxonomy and naming ==
Eucalyptus calyerup was first formally described in 2002 by Nathan K. McQuoid and Stephen Hopper from a specimen collected from near Calyerup Rocks, east of Jerramungup. The description was published in the journal Nuytsia. The specific epithet (calyerup) refers to the type location. The ending -ensis is a Latin suffix "denoting place, locality [or] country".

This species is possibly a stabilised hybrid between E. occidentalis and E. platypus, although the latter species does not occur in the same location.

== Distribution and habitat ==
This eucalypt is found around rocky outcrops in the Great Southern region of Western Australia between Katanning and Jerramungup where it grows in sandy-loam soils over granite.

== Conservation ==
This species is classified as "Priority One" by the Government of Western Australia Department of Parks and Wildlife, meaning that it is known from only one or a few locations which are potentially at risk.

== Use in horticulture ==
Eucalyptus calyerup has been used extensively by the local Landcare group and has been shown to be resistant to lerp attack.

== See also ==
- List of Eucalyptus species
