= Acacia diaphana =

Conservation status
- Priority One — Poorly Known Taxa (DEC)

Scientific classification
- Kingdom: Plantae
- Clade: Tracheophytes
- Clade: Angiosperms
- Clade: Eudicots
- Clade: Rosids
- Order: Fabales
- Family: Fabaceae
- Subfamily: Caesalpinioideae
- Clade: Mimosoid clade
- Genus: Acacia
- Species: A. diaphana

Binomial name
- Acacia diaphana R.S.Cowan & Maslin

Synonyms
- Racosperma diaphanum (R.S.Cowan & Maslin) Pedley

Species of legume

Habit in Kings Park

Acacia diaphana is a species of flowering plant in the family Fabaceae and is endemic to the south of Western Australia. It is a bushy, spreading shrub with ascending linear phyllodes, spherical heads of golden yellow flowers and is found in Cape Arid National Park.

== Description ==
Acacia diaphana is a bushy, spreading shrub that typically grows to a height of 1.5–3 m (4 ft 11 in – 9 ft 10 in) with branchlets that are angular near the ends, later terete. Its phyllodes are ascending, linear and straight to slightly curved, mostly 40–65 mm (1.6–2.6 in) long, 2.5–4 mm (0.098–0.157 in) wide, thinly leathery and glabrous. The veins on the phyllodes are covered with resin, often in obvious droplets. The flowers are borne in spherical heads in two to six racemes 2–8 mm (0.079–0.315 in) long on peduncles 2–5 mm (0.079–0.197 in) long and densely covered with soft, white hairs pressed against the surface. Each head is 3.5–4.5 mm (0.14–0.18 in) in diameter with 15 to 20 golden yellow flowers. Flowering has been observed in September and December, but the pods and seeds have not been seen.

== Taxonomy ==
Acacia diaphana was first formally described in 1999 by Richard Cowan and Bruce Maslin from specimens collected north-west of Mount Ragged in 1990. The specific epithet (diaphana) means 'more or less transparent', referring to the translucent character of the perianth.

== Distribution and habitat ==
This species of wattle grows in clay or sandy loam in waterlogged depressions, often with Eucalyptus occidentalis in an area north-west of Mount Ragged in the Cape Arid National Park, in the Coolgardie and Mallee bioregions.

== Conservation status ==
Acacia diaphana is listed as 'Priority One' by the Government of Western Australia Department of Biodiversity, Conservation and Attractions, meaning that it is known from only one or a few locations where it is potentially at risk.

== See also ==
- List of Acacia species
