= Blister bush =

Blister bush can refer to

- Notobubon galbanum, a shrub endemic to South Africa
- Rhadinothamnus anceps, a shrub endemic to Western Australia
