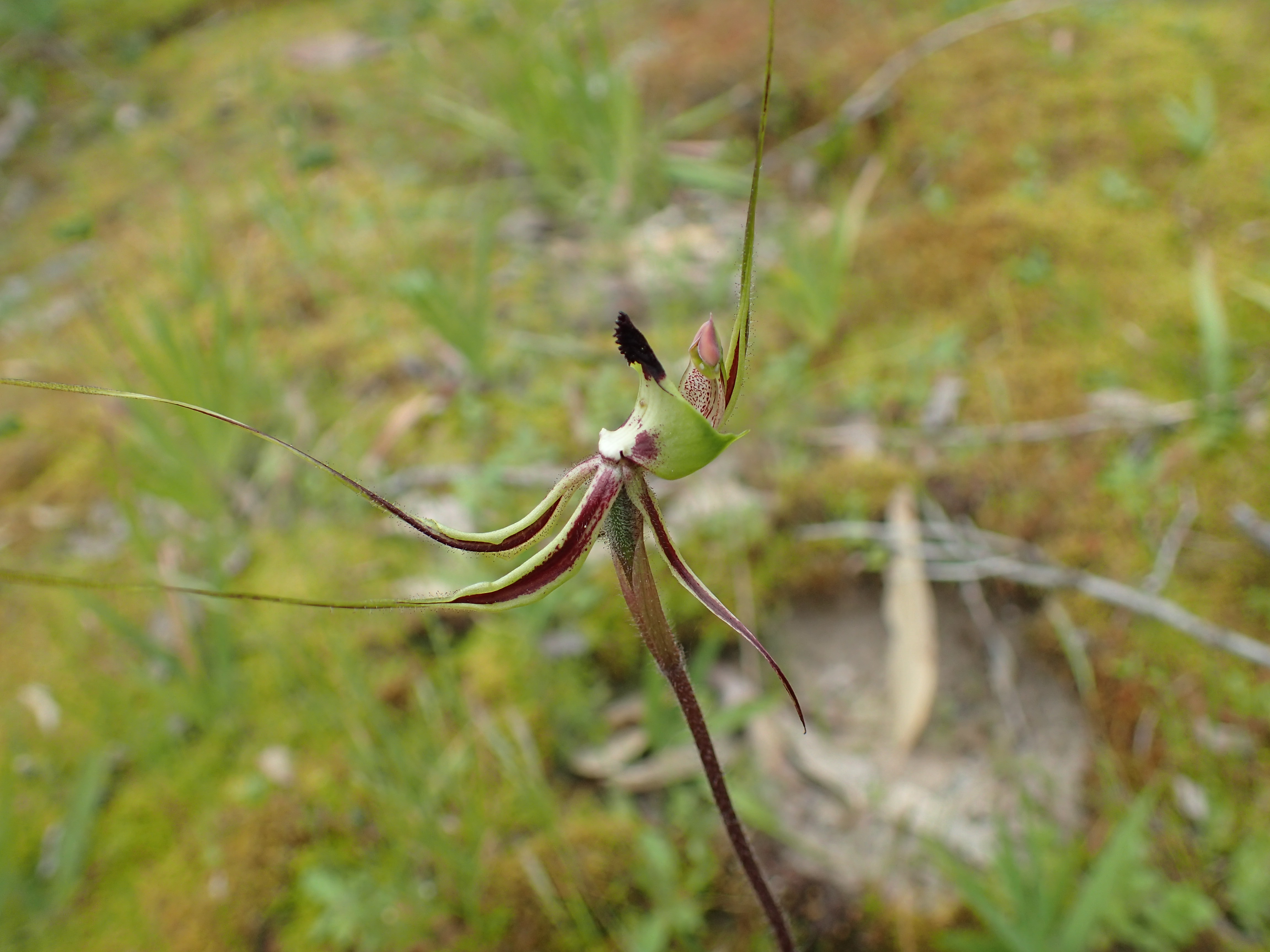
- In Cape Le Grand National Park

Scientific classification
- Kingdom: Plantae
- Clade: Embryophytes
- Clade: Tracheophytes
- Clade: Spermatophytes
- Clade: Angiosperms
- Clade: Monocots
- Order: Asparagales
- Family: Orchidaceae
- Subfamily: Orchidoideae
- Tribe: Diurideae
- Genus: Caladenia
- Species: C. exstans

Binomial name
- Caladenia exstans Hopper & A.P.Br. 2001

Synonyms
- Arachnorchis exstans ( Hopper & A.P.Br.) D.L.Jones & M.A.Clem.; Phlebochilus exstans (Hopper & A.P.Br.) Szlach. & Rutk.

= Caladenia exstans =

Pointing spider orchid

Species of orchid

Caladenia exstans, commonly known as the pointing spider orchid, is a species of orchid endemic to a small area in the south-west of Western Australia. It has a single, hairy leaf and one or two green, yellow and red flowers with a labellum which does not curl downwards but "points" forward.

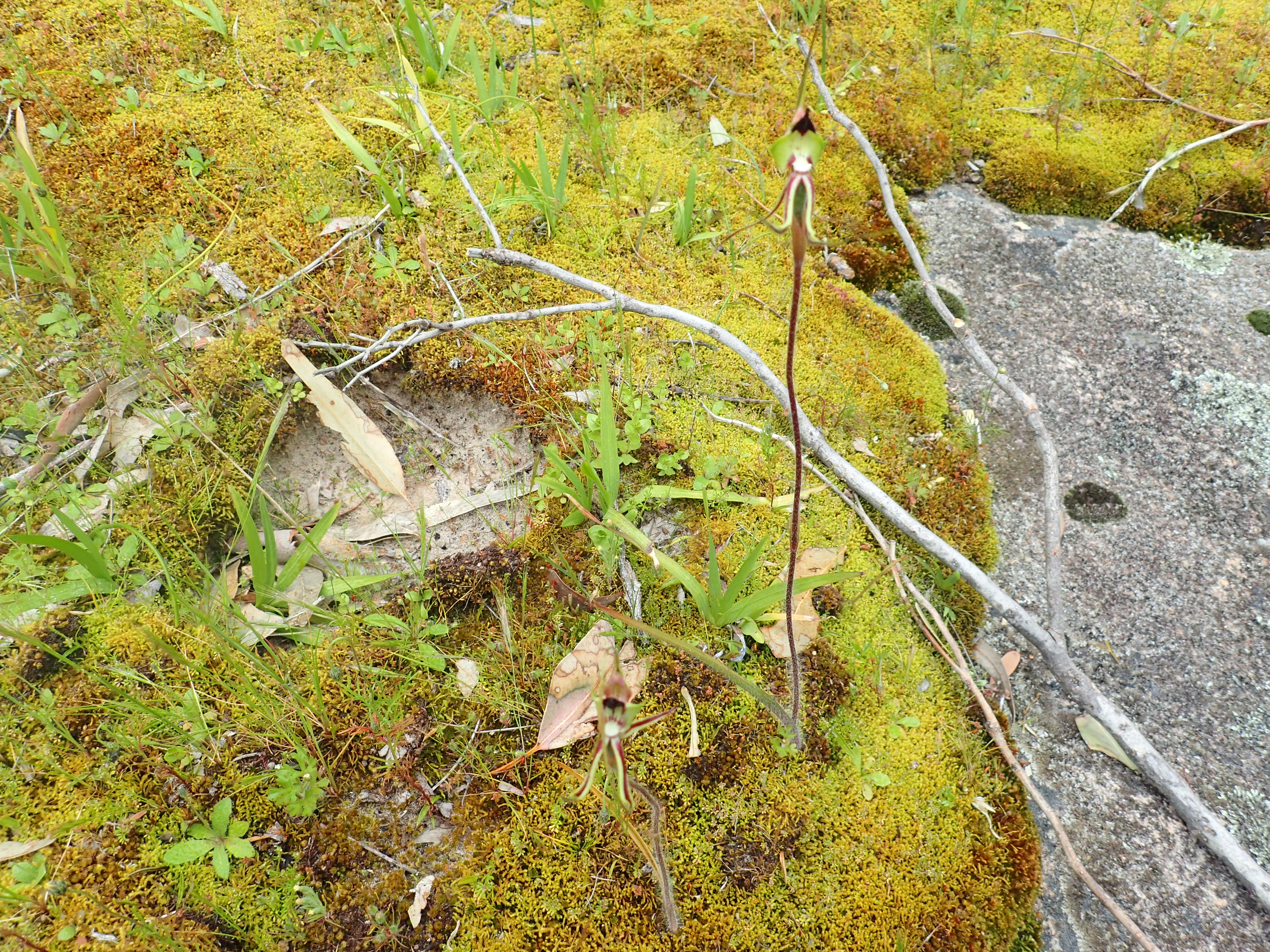
Habit

== Description ==
Caladenia exstans is a terrestrial, perennial, deciduous, herb with an underground tuber and which has a single erect, hairy leaf, 50–200 mm (2–8 in) long and 4–6 mm (0.16–0.24 in) wide. One or two green, yellow and red flowers 40–60 mm (1.6–2.4 in) long and 3–5 mm (0.1–0.2 in) wide are borne on a stalk 200–450 mm (8–20 in) high. The dorsal sepal is erect, 30–45 mm (1–2 in) long and about 3 mm (0.1 in) wide at the base. The lateral sepals are 30–45 mm (1–2 in) long, 4–5 mm (0.16–0.20 in) wide at the base, closely parallel to each other and curve forward and upwards. The sepals have thin, yellowish glandular tips. The petals are 20–30 mm (0.8–1 in) long, about 2 mm (0.08 in) wide at their bases and curve backwards. The labellum is 11–13 mm (0.4–0.5 in) long, 14–15 mm (0.55–0.59 in) wide and delicately hinged. It is greenish-yellow with a dark reddish-purple tip which is not curled under but points forward. The edges of the labellum are smooth and there are four or more rows of deep red calli along its centre. Flowering occurs from September to early November.

The cryptic colouration of this orchid and the relatively small flower on a long stem make this orchid difficult to find but it is the only greenish spider orchid with a smooth-edged labellum occurring east of Esperance.

== Taxonomy and naming ==
Caladenia exstans was first described by Stephen Hopper and Andrew Brown in 2001 from a specimen collected near Esperance. The description was published in Nuytsia. The specific epithet (exstans) is a Latin word meaning "projecting" referring to the pointed labellum.

== Distribution and habitat ==
Pointing spider orchid is found between Esperance and Israelite Bay in the Esperance Plains biogeographic region where it grows in swamp yate forest and in shallow soil on and near granite outcrops.

== Conservation ==
Caladenia exstans is classified as "not threatened" by the Western Australian Government Department of Parks and Wildlife.
