= Acacia bartlei =

Bartle's wattle

Conservation status
- Priority Three — Poorly Known Taxa (DEC)

Scientific classification
- Kingdom: Plantae
- Clade: Tracheophytes
- Clade: Angiosperms
- Clade: Eudicots
- Clade: Rosids
- Order: Fabales
- Family: Fabaceae
- Subfamily: Caesalpinioideae
- Clade: Mimosoid clade
- Genus: Acacia
- Species: A. bartlei

Binomial name
- Acacia bartlei Maslin & J.E.Reid
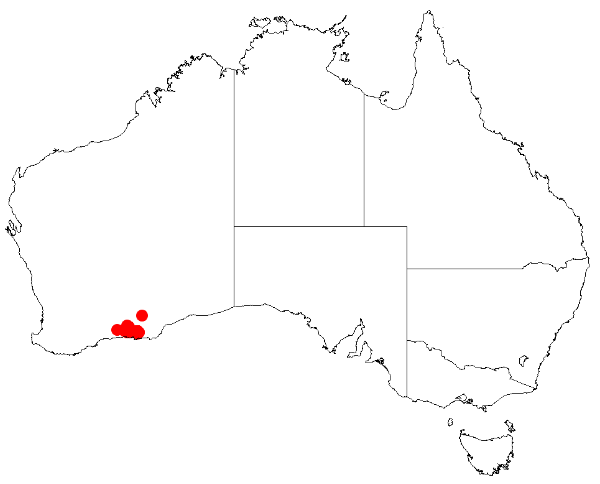
- Acacia bartlei occurrence data from Australasian Virtual Herbarium

Species of shrub

Acacia bartlei, commonly known as Bartle's wattle, is a species of flowering plant in the family Fabaceae and is endemic to a restricted part of the south of Western Australia. It is an erect shrub or tree with narrowly elliptic to narrowly oblong phyllodes, spherical to slightly oblong heads of golden-yellow flowers and linear, straight to slightly curved thinly leathery pods up to 65 mm (2.6 in) long.

== Description ==
Acacia bartlei is an erect shrub or tree that typically grows to a height of 1.5–7 m (4 ft 11 in – 23 ft 0 in) but can be as tall as 10 m (33 ft). Its phyllodes are narrowly elliptic to narrowly oblong, straight to slightly curved, mostly 25–65 mm (0.98–2.56 in) long and 3–6 mm (0.12–0.24 in) wide with a hooked end and mostly three to eight prominent veins. The flowers are borne on racemes with two to four spherical or slightly oblong heads, each head on a peduncle 43–8 mm (1.69–0.31 in) long with about twenty golden yellow flowers. Flowering occurs from late June to mid-October, mainly between late August and late September, and the pods are linear, straight to slightly curved, thinly leathery, 20–65 mm (0.79–2.56 in) long and 2.5–3.5 mm (0.098–0.138 in) wide. The seeds are oblong, more or less shiny, dark brown to black, 3.5–4.5 mm (0.14–0.18 in) long with a yellow-brown aril.

== Taxonomy ==
Acacia bartlei was first formally described in 2012 by Bruce Maslin and Jordan E. Reid from specimens collected by Maslin north-east of Esperance in 2000. The specific epithet (bartlei) honours John Bartle, an agricultural scientist, for his research, improved flora conservation and support of Maslin's work with Acacia.

== Distribution and habitat ==
Bartle's wattle grows in or near waterlogged depressions growing in clay-loam or sandy-loam soils near Esperance, often with Eucalyptus occidentalis, in a few scattered places between Salmon Gums, Scaddan and about 50 km (31 mi) further east.

== Conservation status ==
Acacia bartlei is listed as "Priority Three" meaning that it is poorly known and known from only a few locations but is not under imminent threat.

== See also ==
- List of Acacia species
