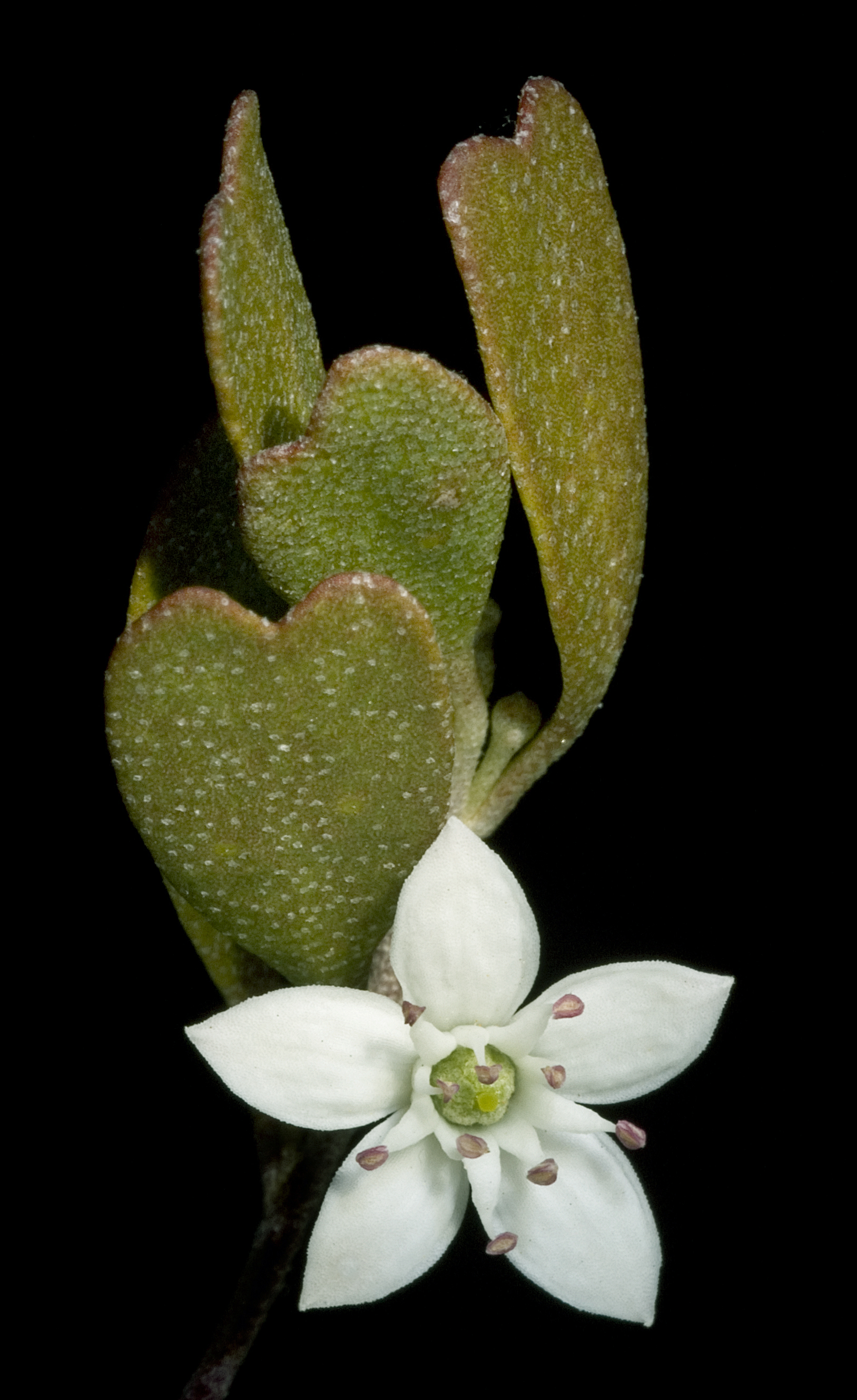
- Rhadinothamnus rudis

Scientific classification
- Kingdom: Plantae
- Clade: Tracheophytes
- Clade: Angiosperms
- Clade: Eudicots
- Clade: Rosids
- Order: Sapindales
- Family: Rutaceae
- Subfamily: Zanthoxyloideae
- Genus: Rhadinothamnus; Paul G.Wilson

Species
- See text.

= Rhadinothamnus =

Genus of plants

Rhadinothamnus is a small genus of shrubs in the family Rutaceae. The genus, which is endemic to Western Australia, was formally described in 1971.

Species include:

- Rhadinothamnus anceps (DC.) Paul G. Wilson — blister bush
- Rhadinothamnus euphemiae (F. Muell.) Paul G. Wilson
- Rhadinothamnus rudis (Bartl.) Paul G. Wilson
