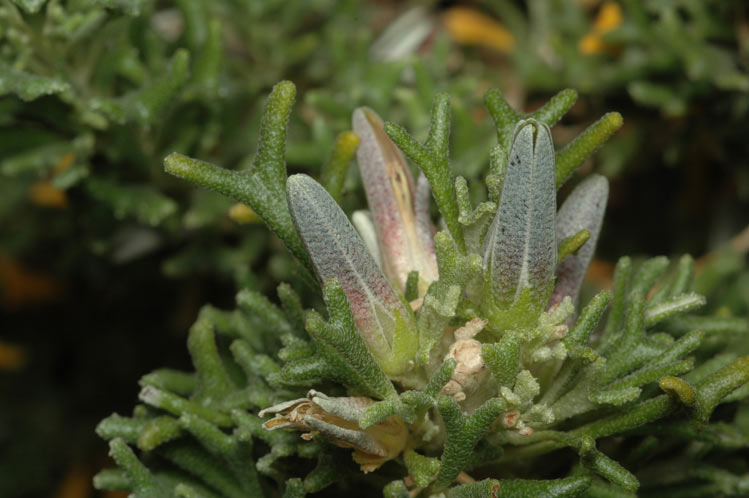

Scientific classification
- Kingdom: Plantae
- Clade: Tracheophytes
- Clade: Angiosperms
- Clade: Eudicots
- Clade: Rosids
- Order: Sapindales
- Family: Rutaceae
- Genus: Rhadinothamnus
- Species: R. euphemiae

Binomial name
- Rhadinothamnus euphemiae (Muell) Paul G.Wilson

= Rhadinothamnus euphemiae =

Species of plant

Rhadinothamnus euphemiae, is a slender, small, upright shrub with needle-shaped branchlets thickly covered with silvery scales and tubular greenish-purple tubular flowers throughout the year. It is endemic to the south coast of Western Australia.

== Description ==
Rhadinothamnus euphemiae is a small, slender, upright shrub to 1 m (3 ft 3 in) high with needle-shaped branchlets densely covered in silvery scales. The leaves are mostly dense on short lateral branches, narrowly triangular tapering to a slender petiole, 1–2 cm (0.39–0.79 in) long, with two spreading lobes, leathery, smooth, occasionally rough or sparsely covered in scales on the upper surface, underneath densely covered in short matted star-shaped hairs. The single flowers are borne on short branchlets 1–2 mm (0.039–0.079 in) long with 2-4 linear shaped bracts at the base of the flower. The calyx has silvery scales, hemispherical, about 3 mm (0.12 in) long, the triangular lobes 1–2 mm (0.039–0.079 in) long. The floral tube has narrow oblong to elliptic petals about 15 mm (0.59 in) long, inside surface of the petal is purplish and hairless, exterior greenish with scale-like hairs. The stamens are smooth and more or less equal to the length of the petals. The fruit is a narrow capsule about 5 mm (0.20 in) long and rounded. Flowering occurs sporadically throughout the year.

== Taxonomy ==
This species was first formally described in 1863 by Ferdinand von Mueller who gave it the name Nematolepis euphemiae and published the description in Fragmenta Phytographiae Australiae. In 1971 Paul G. Wilson changed the name to Rhadinothamnus euphemiae and the name change was published in the journal Nuytsia.

== Distribution and habitat ==
Rhadinothamnus euphemiae grows usually in sandy, rocky hillsides and outcrops from the Eyre Range east to Mount Ragged on the south coast of Western Australia.
