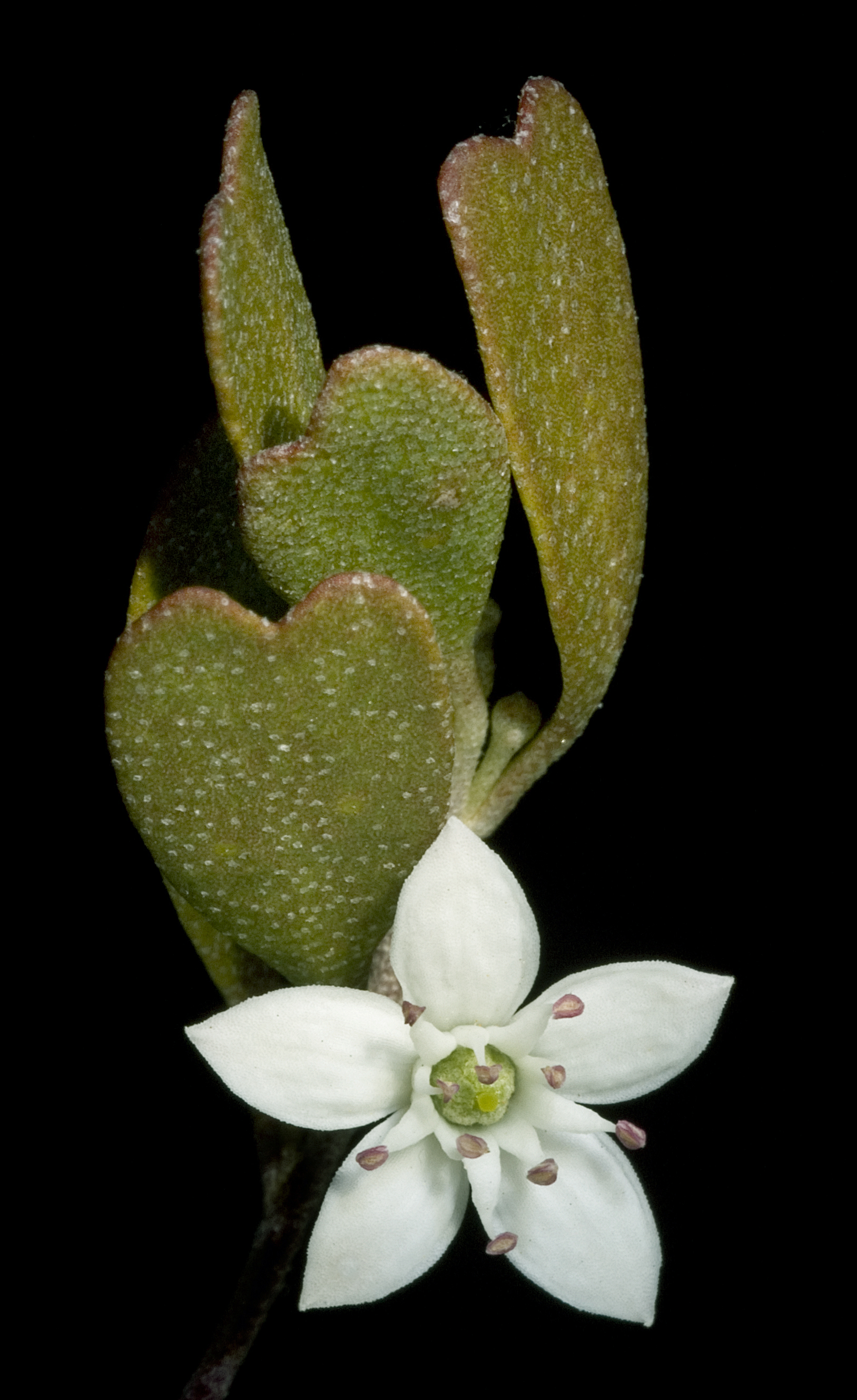

Scientific classification
- Kingdom: Plantae
- Clade: Tracheophytes
- Clade: Angiosperms
- Clade: Eudicots
- Clade: Rosids
- Order: Sapindales
- Family: Rutaceae
- Genus: Rhadinothamnus
- Species: R. rudis

Binomial name
- Rhadinothamnus rudis (Bartl.) Paul G.Wilson

= Rhadinothamnus rudis =

Species of plant

Rhadinothamnus rudis is a small shrub with needle-shaped, angular branchlets and single white flowers at the end of branches. This species and the three subspecies are endemic to Western Australia.

== Description ==
Rhadinothamnus rudis is a shrub to 1.5 m (4 ft 11 in) high with terete, angular branchlets. The leaves are variable they may be wide or narrowly notched at the apex or almost circular, 7–35 mm (0.28–1.38 in) long, smooth edges, papery to leathery texture, smooth, on a short petiole. The white flowers are borne singly in leaf axils on an angular pedicel 3–10 mm (0.12–0.39 in) long, 2.5–3 mm (0.098–0.118 in) wide and the underside covered with small, silvery scales. The stamens marginally shorter than the petals. The fruit is a capsule about 5 mm (0.20 in) high, almost smooth, either with a short triangular point or with a blunt beak. Flowering occurs from January to December.

== Taxonomy ==
This species was first formally described in 1845 by Friedrich Gottlieb Bartling and he gave it the name Phebalium rude, the description was published in Lehmann'sPlantae Preissianae. In 1998 Paul G. Wilson changed the name to Rhadinothamnus rudis and published the name change in the journal Nuytsia.

There are three subspecies described by Paul Wilson and accepted by the Australian Plant Census:

- Rhadinothamnus rudis subsp. rudis, has young branchlets prominently angular, leaves 7–35 mm (0.28–1.38 in) wide, seed capsule mostly with a short beak;
- Rhadinothamnus rudis subsp. amblycarpus, has young branchlets barely to prominently angular, leaves linear-wedge shaped or narrowly to broadly heart shaped, leaves 15–17 mm (0.59–0.67 in) long, 4–9 mm (0.16–0.35 in) wide, seed capsule rounded at the apex and bluntly beaked;
- Rhadinothamnus rudis subsp. linearis, has leaves thick, narrow, tapering slightly toward the base, about 20 mm (0.79 in) long, 1–1.5 mm (0.039–0.059 in) wide, rounded at the apex, seed capsule more or less square, ending minutely in triangular point.

== Distribution and habitat ==
Rhadinothamnus rudis is found growing on hills and plains in clay, sand, rocky soils, limestone, laterite and quartzite from Albany to Esperance on the south coast of Western Australia.

- Subspecies rudis occurs near the south coast between Point Irwin and Cape Arid often growing over limestone on plains and gravelly hillside. Flowers throughout the year.
- Subspecies amblycarpus grows on the south coast, more inland from Nyabing in the east to Esperance. Flowers sporadically throughout the year.
- Subspecies linearis grows in the Russell Range on shallow, sandy soils over quartzite or granite. Flowers throughout the year.
