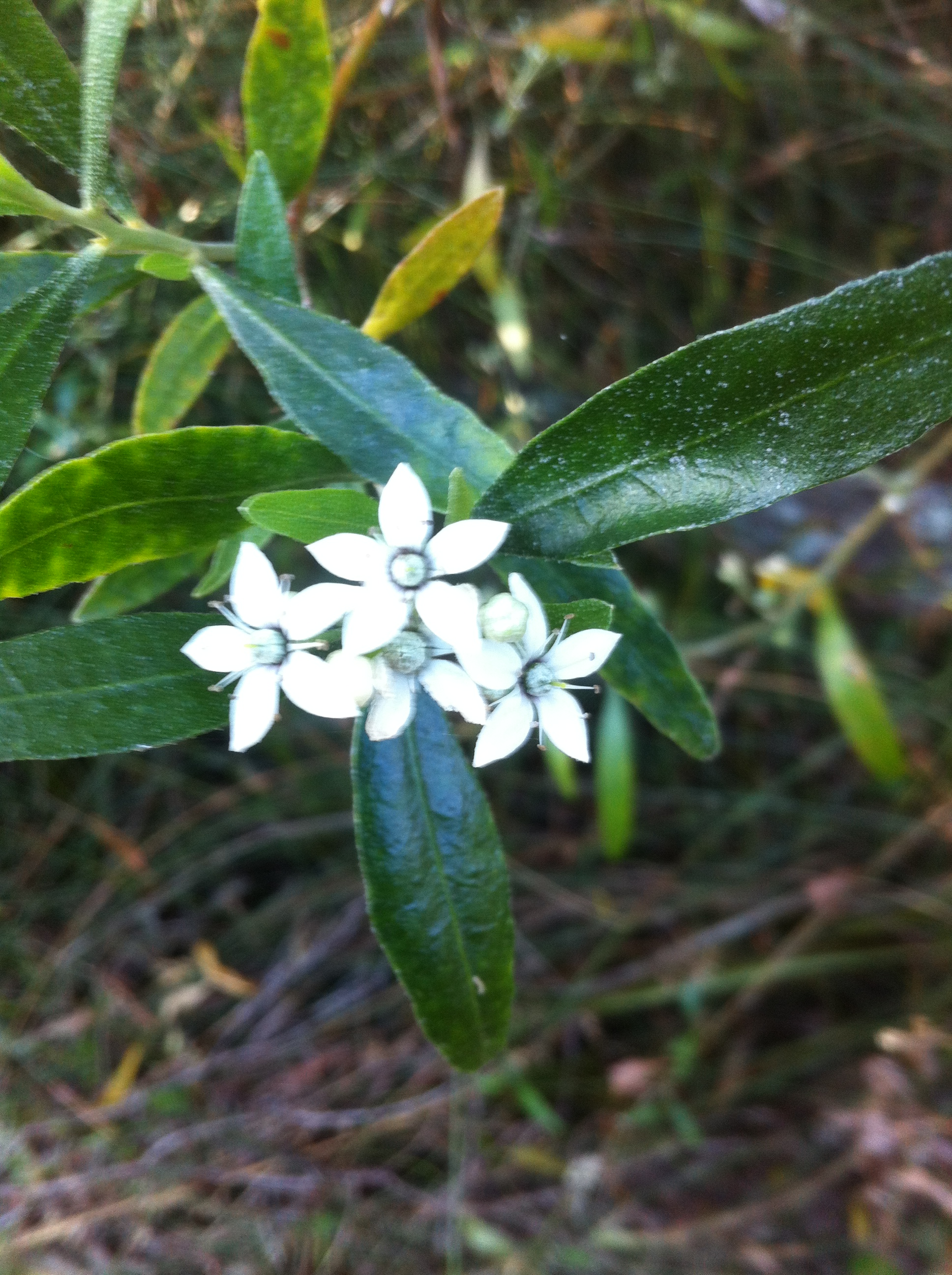
- Rhadinothamnus anceps flowers

Scientific classification
- Kingdom: Plantae
- Clade: Tracheophytes
- Clade: Angiosperms
- Clade: Eudicots
- Clade: Rosids
- Order: Sapindales
- Family: Rutaceae
- Genus: Rhadinothamnus
- Species: R. anceps

Binomial name
- Rhadinothamnus anceps (DC.) Paul G.Wilson

Synonyms
- Phebalium anceps Phebalium argenteum

= Rhadinothamnus anceps =

Species of plant

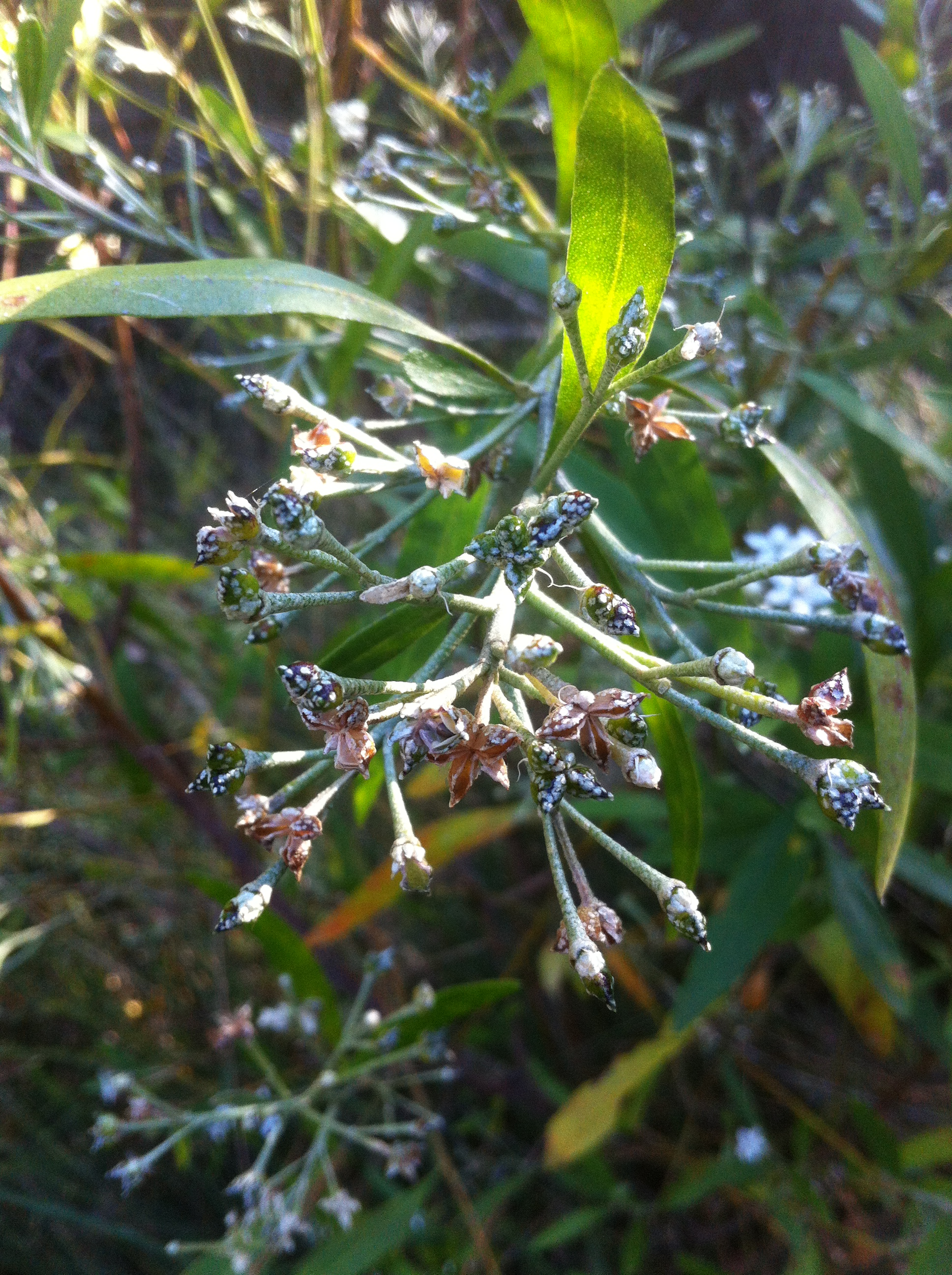
Rhadinothamnus anceps foliage

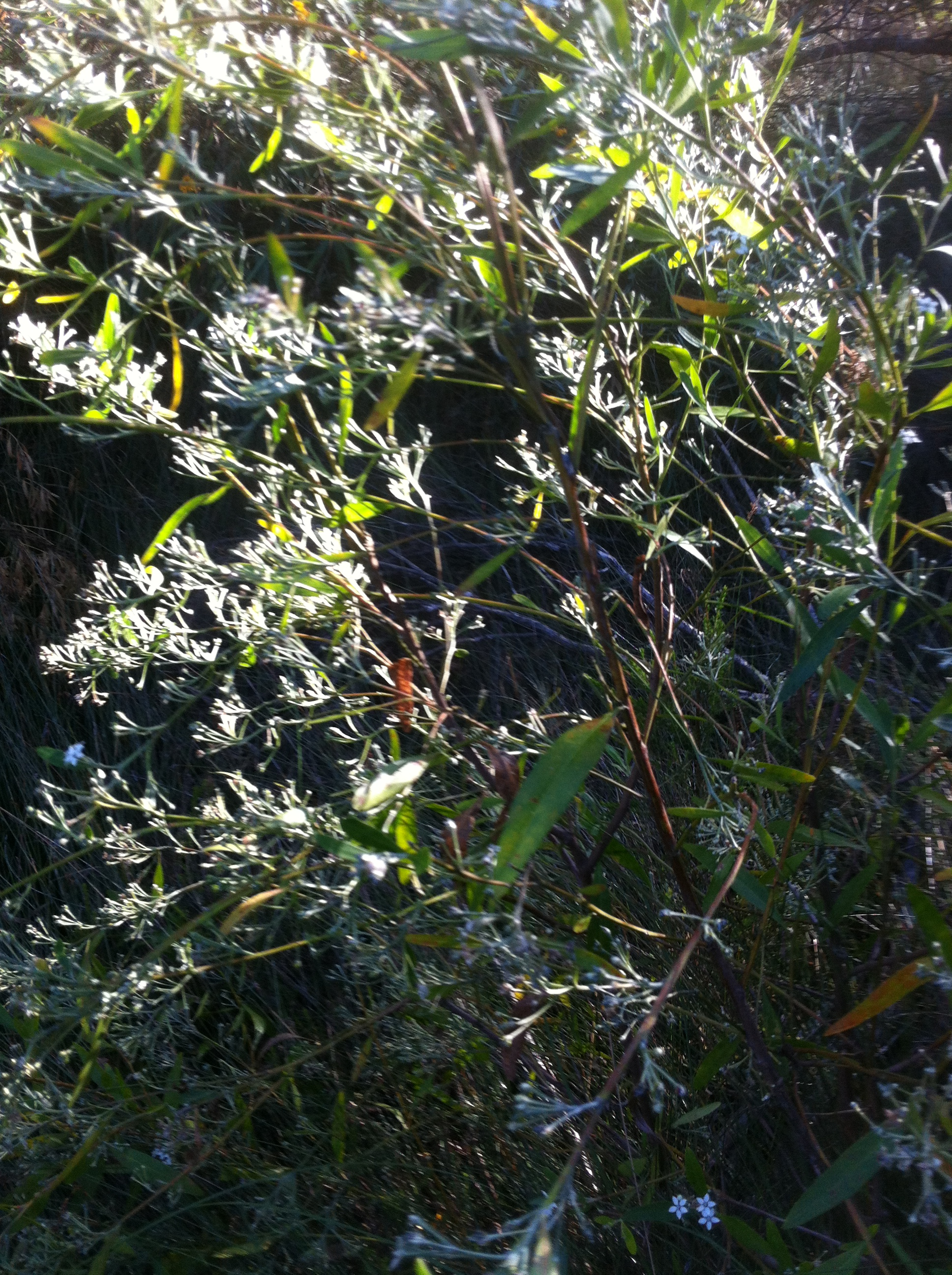
Rhadinothamnus anceps habit

Rhadinothamnus anceps, commonly known as blister bush, is a shrub belonging to the genus of Rhadinothamnus, which is endemic to Western Australia.

== Description ==
The slender erect perennial shrub typically grows to a height of 1 to 3 metres (3 to 10 ft) and has angular branchlets with silver scales present on young growth. The leaves are alternate, a papery silvery pale green colour on short petioles. The leaf blade is a narrow elliptic shape with a length of 40 to 120 millimetres (1.6 to 4.7 in) and a width of 8 to 23 mm (0.31 to 0.91 in). The leaves release a strong mango smell when crushed. The leaves must be handled carefully as they can cause blisters if they contact the skin. It blooms between August and December producing white flowers. The flowers are supported on 4 to 12 mm (0.16 to 0.47 in) pedicels in cymes at the terminus of branches and in the leaf axils. The flowers have a Calyx - hemispherical calyx that is 1 to 1.5 mm (0.039 to 0.059 in) long that has five triangle shaped lobed and is a silver colour. There are five free white petals with a broadly oval shape and a length of 4.5 to 6 mm (0.18 to 0.24 in). The later form fruit with five smooth sections that are shortly beaked having a length of 3 mm (0.12 in) containing flat oval seeds.

== Distribution ==
The shrub is found along creeks and swamp areas in areas along the coast in the Swan Coastal Plain, Peel, South West and Great Southern regions of Western Australia from between Yanchep to just east of Albany where it grows well in black peaty sandy soils. It is spread over the Esperance Plains, Jarrah Forest, Swan Coastal Plain and Warren IBRA regions.

== Classification ==
The species was first described as Phebalium anceps by the botanist Augustin Pyramus de Candolle in 1824 in the work Prodromus Systematis Naturalis Regni Vegetabilis. In 1825 it was reclassified as Eriostemon anceps by Kurt Polycarp Joachim Sprengel in Systema Vegetabilium. Paul G. Wilson reclassified the plant into its current genera as R. anceps in the article New species and nomenclatural changes in Phebalium and related genera (Rutaceae) in the journal Nuytsia published in 1998.
