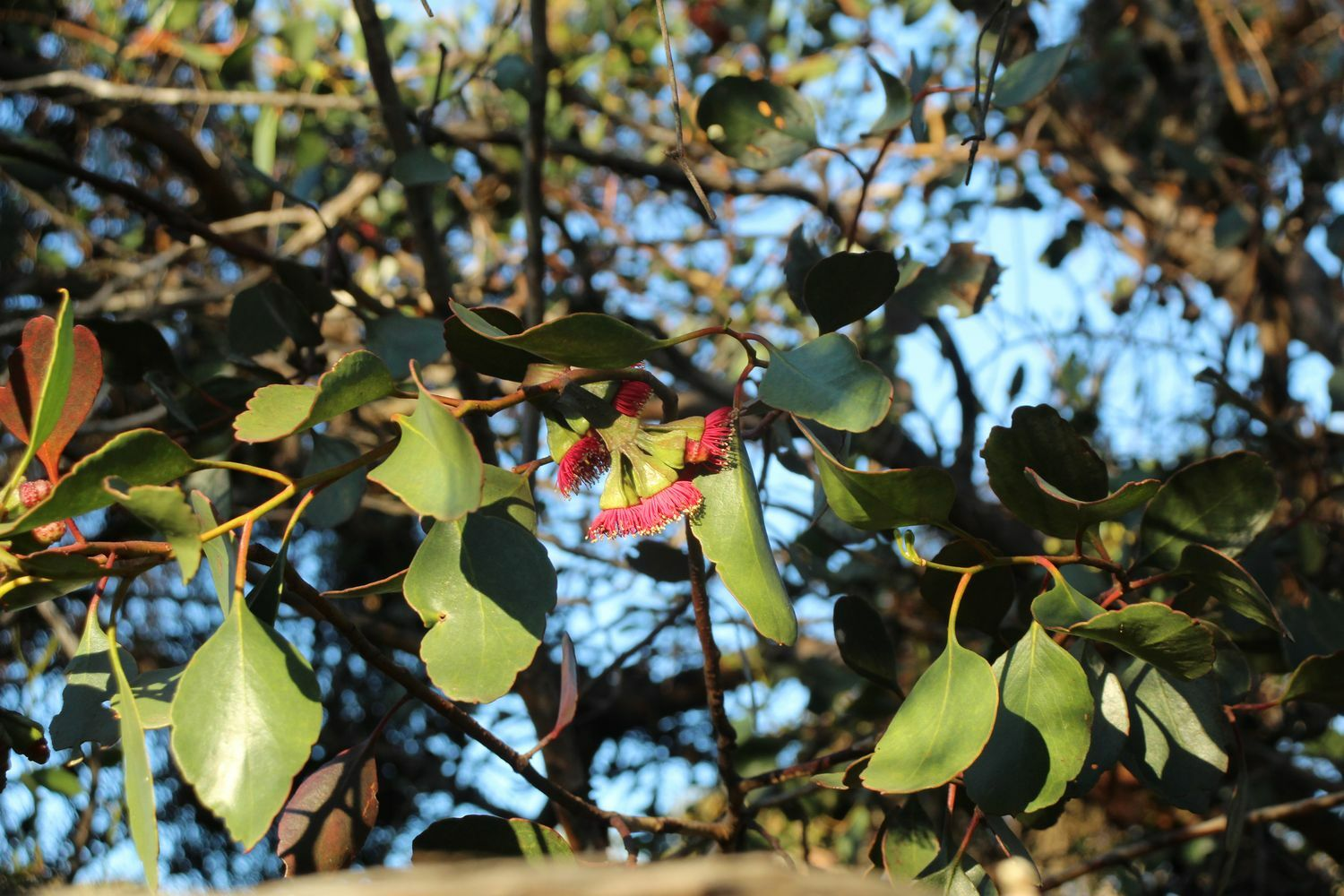

Conservation status
- Vulnerable (IUCN 3.1)

- Priority Four — Rare Taxa (DEC)

Scientific classification
- Kingdom: Plantae
- Clade: Tracheophytes
- Clade: Angiosperms
- Clade: Eudicots
- Clade: Rosids
- Order: Myrtales
- Family: Myrtaceae
- Genus: Eucalyptus
- Species: E. vesiculosa

Binomial name
- Eucalyptus vesiculosa Brooker & Hopper

= Eucalyptus vesiculosa =

Corackerup marlock

Species of eucalyptus

Eucalyptus vesiculosa, commonly known as the Corackerup marlock, is a species of marlock (a small, shrubby tree with a crown extending to near ground level) that is endemic to a small area on the south coast of Western Australia. It has smooth bark, elliptical to egg-shaped leaves, flower buds usually in groups of seven, red flowers and conical fruit.

== Description ==
Eucalyptus vesiculosa is a marlock that typically grows to a height of 3 m (9.8 ft) but does not form a lignotuber. It has smooth, shiny grey bark that is reddish brown when new. The adult leaves are arranged alternately, the same shade of green on both sides, thick, elliptical to egg-shaped or more or less round, 50–70 mm (2.0–2.8 in) long and 25–40 mm (0.98–1.57 in) wide, tapering to a petiole 20–30 mm (0.79–1.18 in) long. The flower buds are arranged in leaf axils in groups of seven on an unbranched peduncle 10–45 mm (0.39–1.77 in) long, the individual buds sessile or on pedicels up to 6 mm (0.24 in) long. Mature buds are oval, shaped like an egg in an eggcup, 15–17 mm (0.59–0.67 in) long and 9–10 mm (0.35–0.39 in) wide with a warty, conical to rounded operculum. Flowering has been observed in May, September and October and the flowers have red stamens with cream-coloured anthers. The fruit is a woody conical capsule 15–18 mm (0.59–0.71 in) long and 14–20 mm (0.55–0.79 in) wide with the valves near rim level.

== Taxonomy and naming ==
Eucalyptus vesiculosa was first formally described in 2002 by Ian Brooker and Stephen Hopper in the journal Nuytsia from specimens they collected in 1995 near the Boxwood Hill - Ongerup road. The specific epithet (vesiculosa) is from the Latin word vesiculosus meaning "covered with little blisters", referring to the warty operculum.

== Distribution and habitat ==
Corackerup marlock is only known from two localities near Ongerup where it grows in more or less pure stands.

== Conservation status ==
This eucalypt is classified as "Priority Four" by the Government of Western Australia Department of Parks and Wildlife, meaning that is rare or near threatened. The IUCN Red List assesses the species as Vulnerable.

== See also ==
- List of Eucalyptus species
