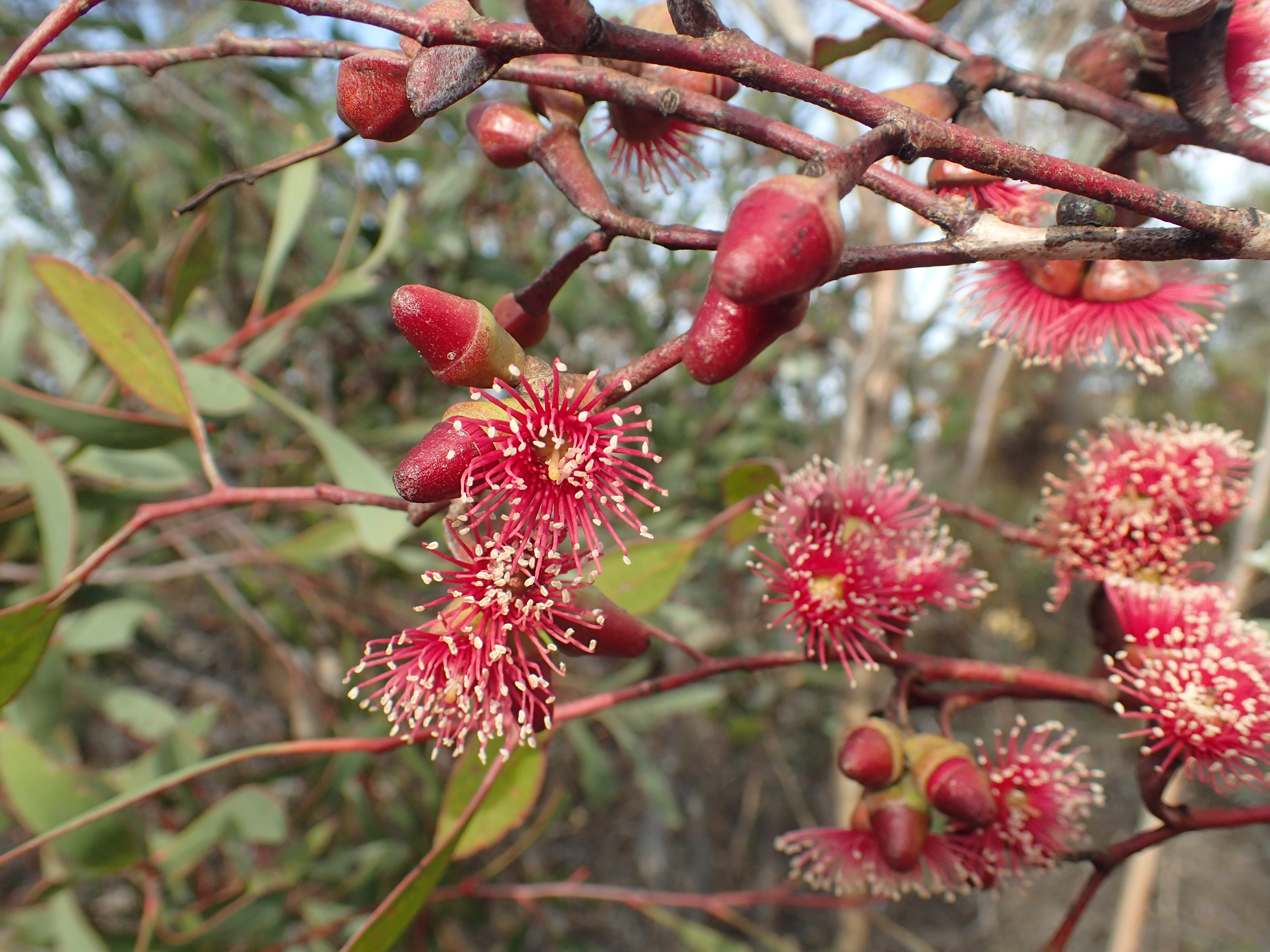
- Eucalyptus cernua flowers

Scientific classification
- Kingdom: Plantae
- Clade: Tracheophytes
- Clade: Angiosperms
- Clade: Eudicots
- Clade: Rosids
- Order: Myrtales
- Family: Myrtaceae
- Genus: Eucalyptus
- Species: E. cernua

Binomial name
- Eucalyptus cernua Brooker & Hopper

= Eucalyptus cernua =

Red-flowered moort

Species of eucalyptus

Eucalyptus cernua, commonly known as the red-flowered moort or the yellow-flowered moort, is a eucalypt that is native to Western Australia.

== Description ==
The mallee typically grows to a height of 1 to 3 metres (3 to 10 ft) but can reach as high as 5 m (16 ft). It has smooth mottled grey to brown coloured bark that can become black over greenish yellow new bark. It has no lignotuber and a single stem. The concolorous glossy green adult leaves are arranged alternately. The leaf blade has a lanceolate shape that is 4.2 to 9.5 centimetres (1.7 to 3.7 in) in length and 1.2 to 3.3 cm (0.47 to 1.30 in) wide with a base tapering to petiole. It blooms between October and December and produces crimson-red flowers. Each axillary unbranched inflorescence is often down-turned and 1.2 to 2.8 cm (0.47 to 1.10 in) in length and occurs groups of seven per umbel.

== Taxonomy ==
The species was first formally described by the botanists Ian Brooker and Stephen Hopper in 2002 and Taxonomy of species deriving from the publication of Eucalyptus subseries Cornutae Benth. (Myrtaceae) as published in the journal Nuytsia. The specific epithet is taken from the Latin word cernuus meaning nodding, towards earth in reference referring to the downward facing inflorescences. The species was previously thought to have been Eucalyptus nutans.

== Distribution ==
It has a limited range along the south coast of Western Australia in the Goldfields-Esperance region near Ravensthorpe particularly in the Fitzgerald River National Park.

== Cultivation ==
It is used for ornamental plantings, shade and honey production. When cultivated it can tolerate arid area, is slow growing and requires little maintenance.

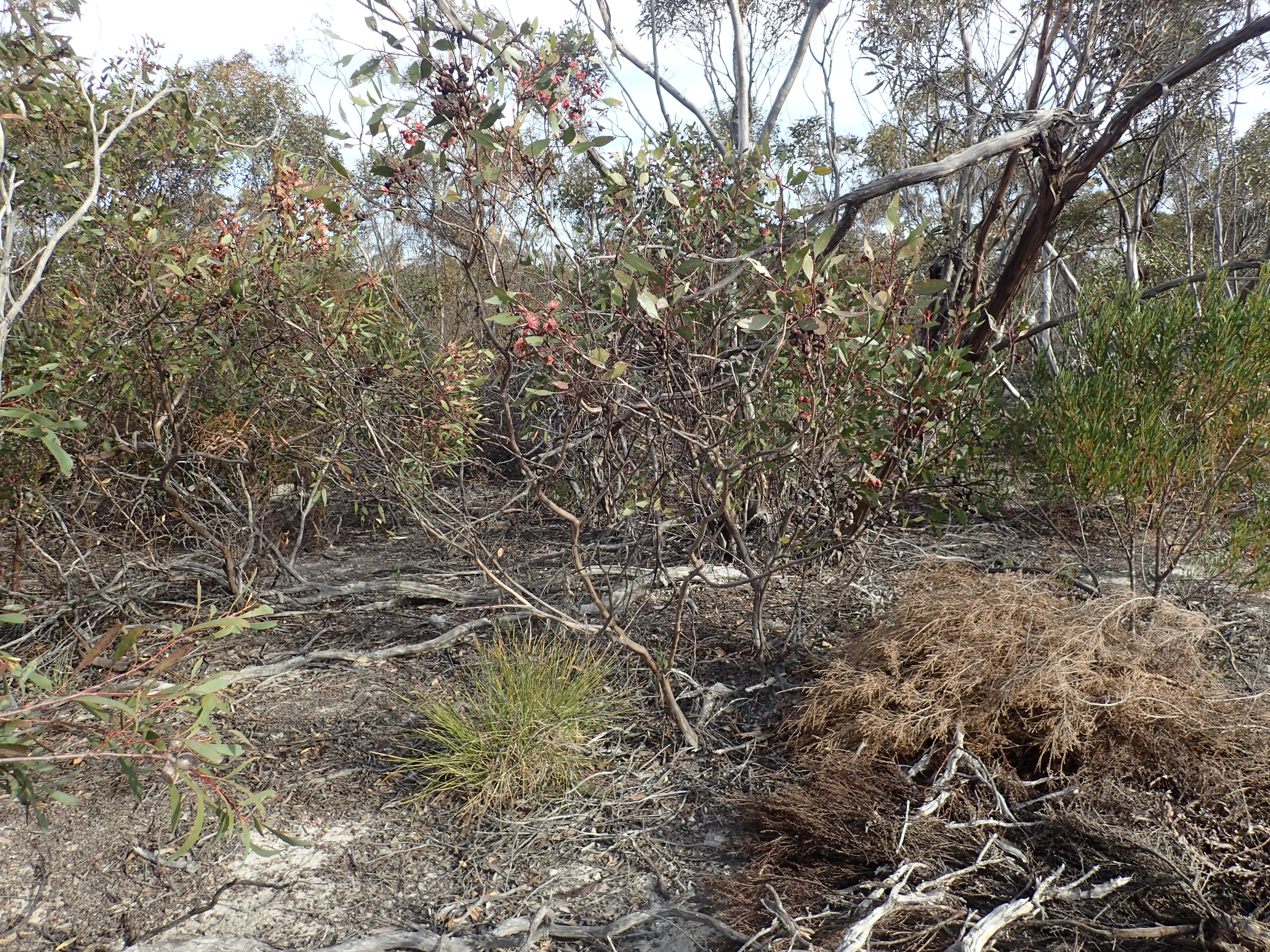
Habit at Kundip, between Ravensthorpe and Hopetoun

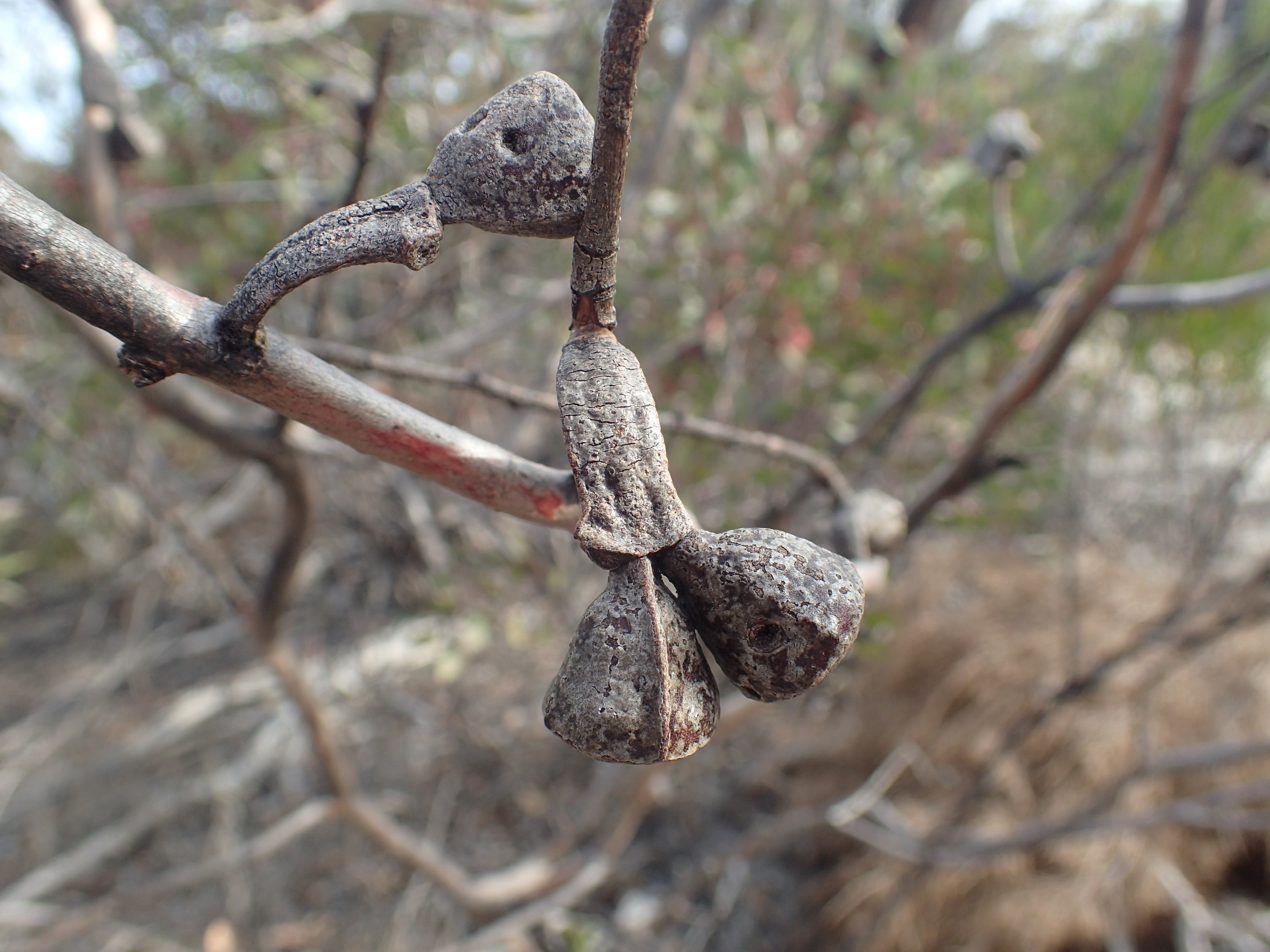
fruit

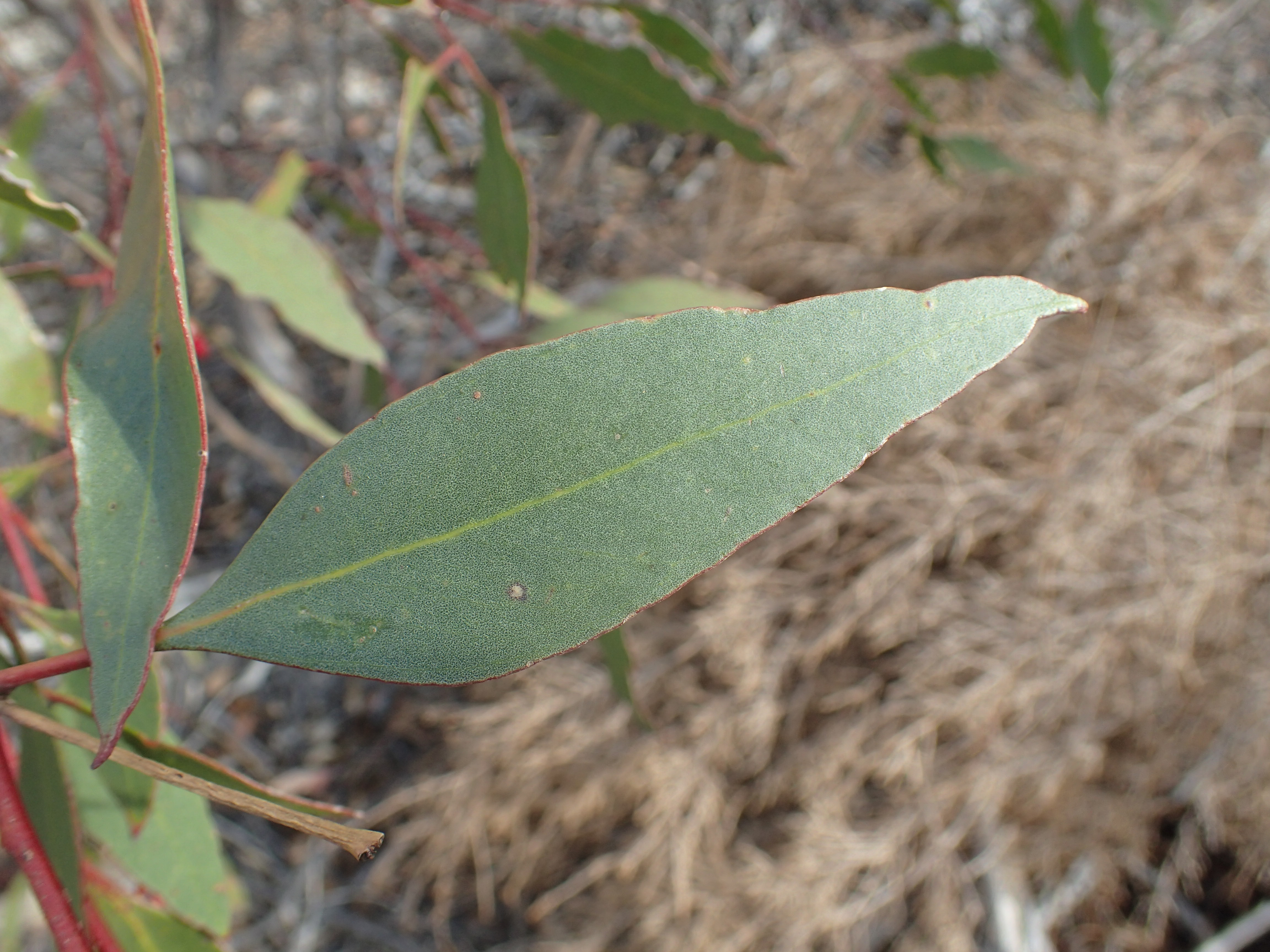
typical leaf

== See also ==
- List of Eucalyptus species
