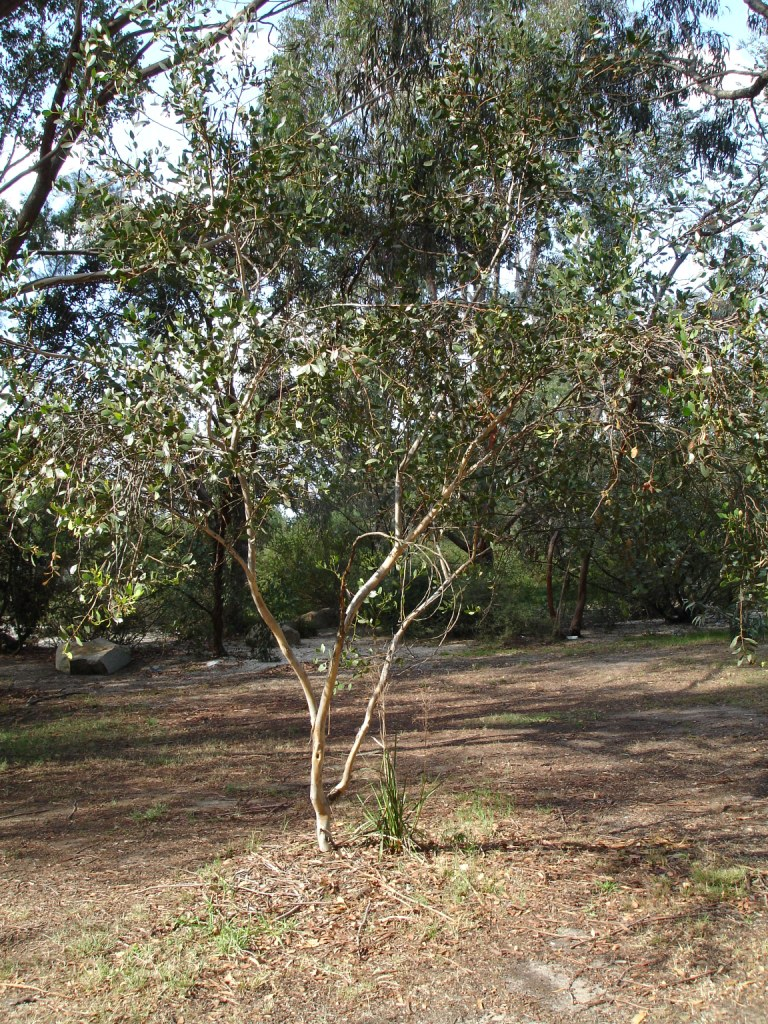
- Juvenile Eucalyptus platypus in Maranoa Gardens

Conservation status
- Endangered (IUCN 3.1)

Scientific classification
- Kingdom: Plantae
- Clade: Tracheophytes
- Clade: Angiosperms
- Clade: Eudicots
- Clade: Rosids
- Order: Myrtales
- Family: Myrtaceae
- Genus: Eucalyptus
- Species: E. platypus

Binomial name
- Eucalyptus platypus Hook.
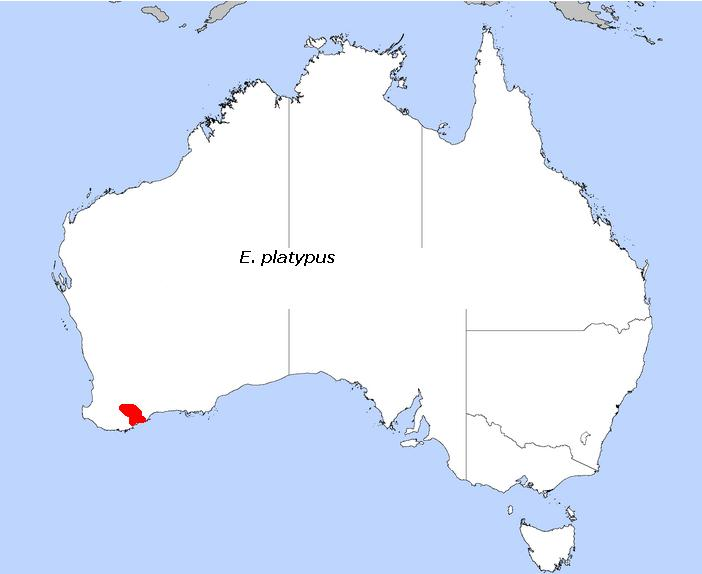
- E. platypus, field distribution

= Eucalyptus platypus =

Moort

Species of eucalyptus

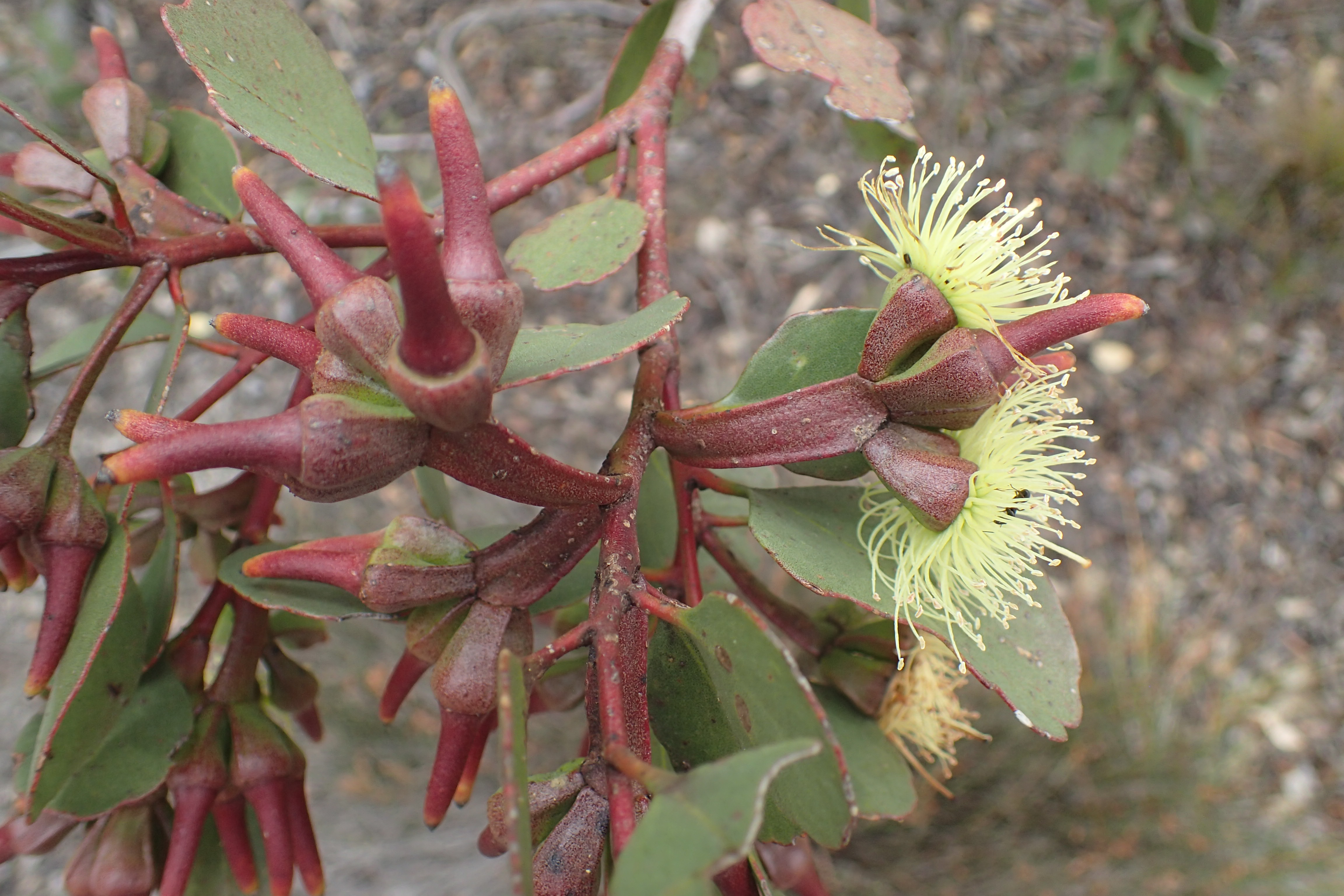
Flower buds and flowers

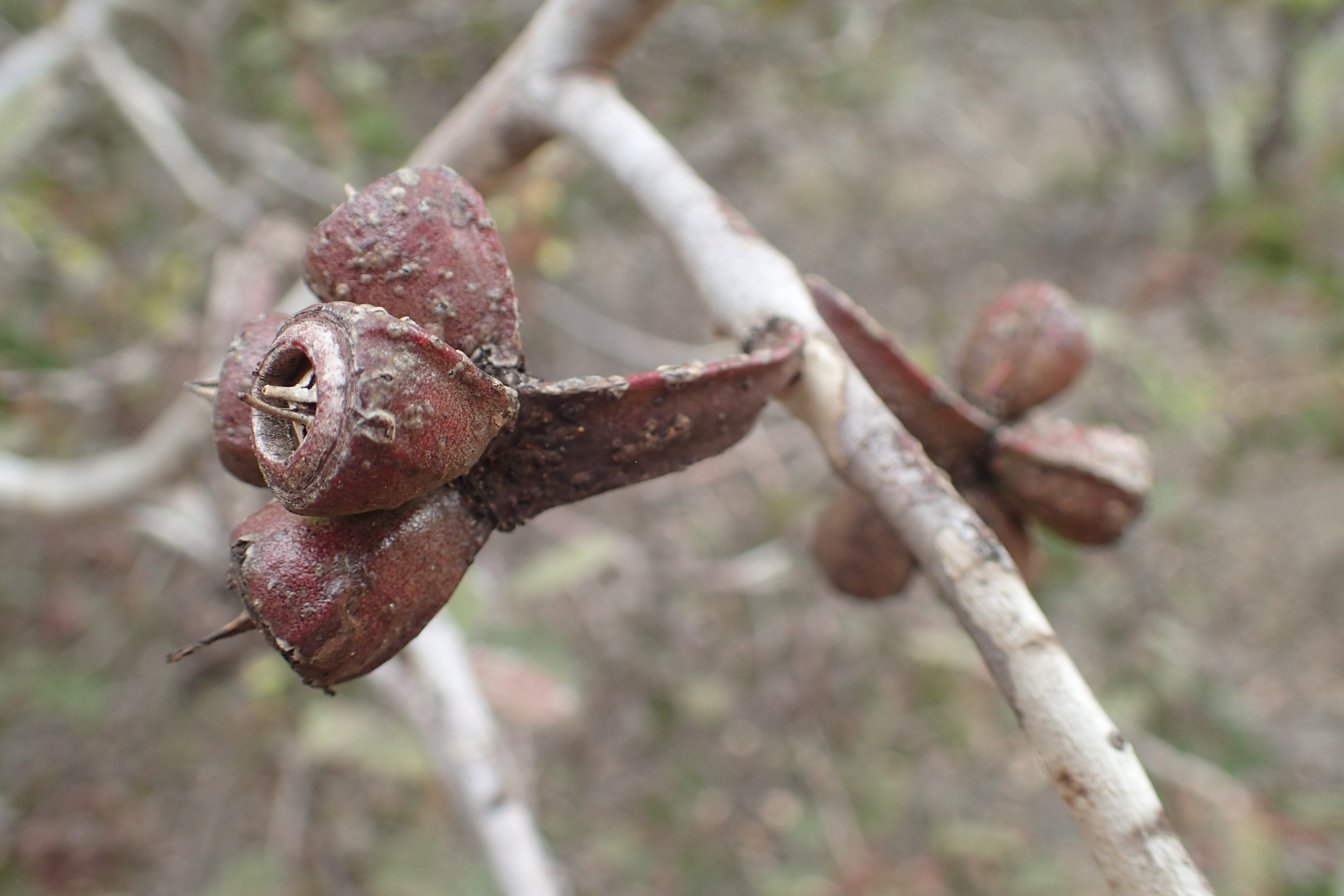
Fruit

Eucalyptus platypus, also known as moort or maalok, is a species of mallee or marlock that is endemic to the southwest of Western Australia. It has smooth bark, broadly elliptical to more or less round adult leaves, flower buds in groups of nine on a broad, flattened peduncle, usually creamy white flowers and conical, down-turned fruit.

== Description ==
Eucalyptus platypus is a mallee or a marlock that typically grows to a height of 1.5–10 m (4 ft 11 in – 32 ft 10 in) and a width of 5–10 m (16–33 ft) with a dense, rounded crown but does not form a lignotuber. The bark is smooth, brownish or copper-coloured. Young plants and coppice regrowth have egg-shaped to more or less round leaves 40–65 mm (1.6–2.6 in) long and wide. Adult leaves are the same shade of glossy green on both sides, broadly elliptical to more or less round, 30–50 mm (1.2–2.0 in) long and 20–40 mm (0.79–1.57 in) wide on a thick petiole 3–20 mm (0.12–0.79 in) long. The flower buds are arranged in leaf axils on a broad, flatted, unbranched peduncle 13–40 mm (0.51–1.57 in) long and 10–20 mm (0.39–0.79 in) wide, the buds sessile or on pedicels up to 4 mm (0.16 in) long. Mature buds are elongated, 25–32 mm (0.98–1.26 in) long and 7–9 mm (0.28–0.35 in) wide with a horn-shaped operculum that is up to three times as long as the floral cup. Flowering occurs from September to December or from January to March and the flowers are creamy white, sometimes yellowish green or pinkish. The fruit is a woody, down-turned, conical capsule 10–17 mm (0.39–0.67 in) long and 10–12 mm (0.39–0.47 in) wide with the valves at rim level.

== Taxonomy and naming ==
Eucalyptus platypus was first formally described in 1851 by William Jackson Hooker in his book Icones Plantarum from material collected near King George's Sound by James Drummond. The specific epithet (platypus) is from the ancient Greek words platys (πλατύς) meaning "broad" or "flat and pous (πούς) meaning "foot", referring to the peduncle.

In 2002, Ian Brooker and Stephen Hopper described two subspecies and the names have been accepted by the Australian Plant Census:

- Eucalyptus platypus subsp. congregata Brooker & Hopper that differs from subspecies platypus in having consistently elliptical leaves and elongated peduncles;
- Eucalyptus platypus Hook. subsp. platypus.

The Noongar names for this species are maalok or moort.

== Distribution and habitat ==
Moort occurs in an area between Albany and Esperance in Western Australia. It is found on plains and hilly, rocky country in the Great Southern and Goldfields-Esperance regions of Western Australia where it grows in sandy, loam or clay soils often around laterite. It extends from coastal areas and is seen as far west as Broomehill to Ravensthorpe in the east.

The species is considered as a weed on the Eyre Peninsula where it is known to invade disturbed areas of native vegetation. The dense low-growing foliage then prevents growth of understorey species.

== Conservation status ==
This eucalypt is classified as "not threatened" by the Western Australian Government Department of Parks and Wildlife.

== Use in horticulture ==
This fast growing species is sold commercially and is well suited to heavy soils. It is resistant to frost and drought, will tolerate water logging and smog. They are ideal for coppicing and respond well to pruning. The bushy nature of the plant make it well suited for use as a windbreak and the floriferous nature make it useful for beekeepers and honey production.

== See also ==
- List of Eucalyptus species
