= Red Ash =

Red Ash or red ash may refer to:

== Places ==
- Red Ash, Virginia, United States
- Red Ash, West Virginia, United States

== Trees ==
- Red ash, Fraxinus pennsylvanica, a species of ash tree native to eastern and central North America
- Alphitonia excelsa or red ash, a tree from Australia
- Alphitonia whitei or red ash, a tree from Australia

== Other uses ==
- Red Ash: The Indelible Legend, a "cancelled" video game crowdfunding campaign. It is uncertain whether the project did get cancelled or development has been put on hold.
