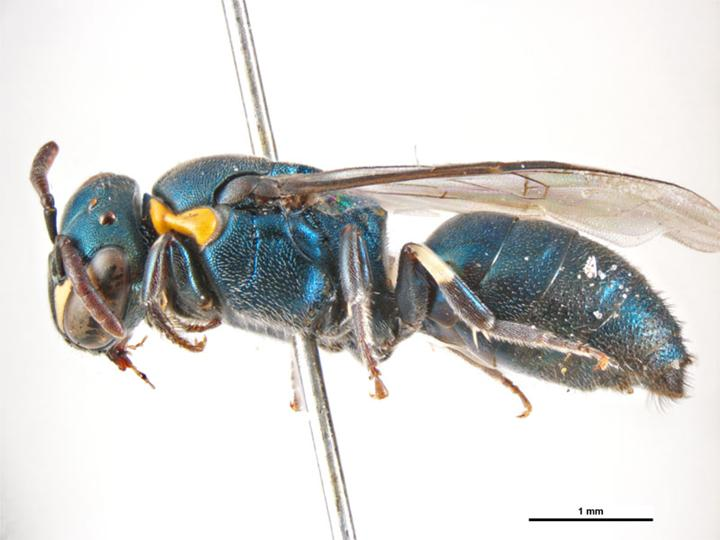
- Female

Scientific classification
- Kingdom: Animalia
- Phylum: Arthropoda
- Clade: Pancrustacea
- Class: Insecta
- Order: Hymenoptera
- Family: Colletidae
- Genus: Hylaeus
- Species: H. chromaticus

Binomial name
- Hylaeus chromaticus (Cockerell, 1912)

Synonyms
- Prosopis albonitens chromatica Cockerell, 1912

= Hylaeus chromaticus =

Species of bee

Hylaeus chromaticus, or Hylaeus (Gnathoprosopis) chromaticus, is a species of bee in the family Colletidae and subfamily Hylaeinae. It is endemic to Australia. It was described by British-American entomologist Theodore Dru Alison Cockerell in 1912.

== Description ==
Integumental colouration is mainly black, with yellow markings.

== Distribution and habitat ==
The species occurs in eastern mainland Australia. The type locality is Mackay, Queensland.

== Behaviour ==
The adults are flying mellivores. Flowering plants visited by the bees include Alphitonia, Angophora, Boronia, Bursaria, Callistemon, Dendrobium, Eucalyptus, Jacksonia, Leptospermum, Melaleuca and Tristaniopsis species.

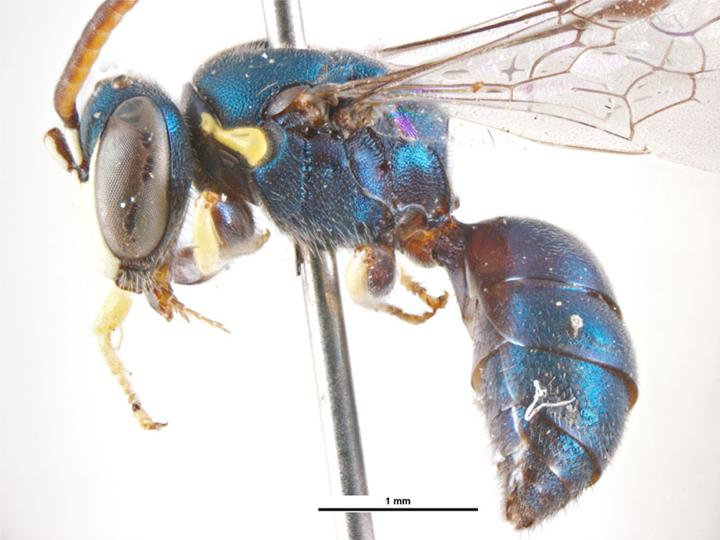
Male
