= Eucalyptus rostrata =

Eucalyptus rostrata is a scientific name that has been used for two plant species and is hence a synonym for:

- Eucalyptus robusta, swamp mahogany or swamp messmate
- Eucalyptus camaldulensis, river red gum
