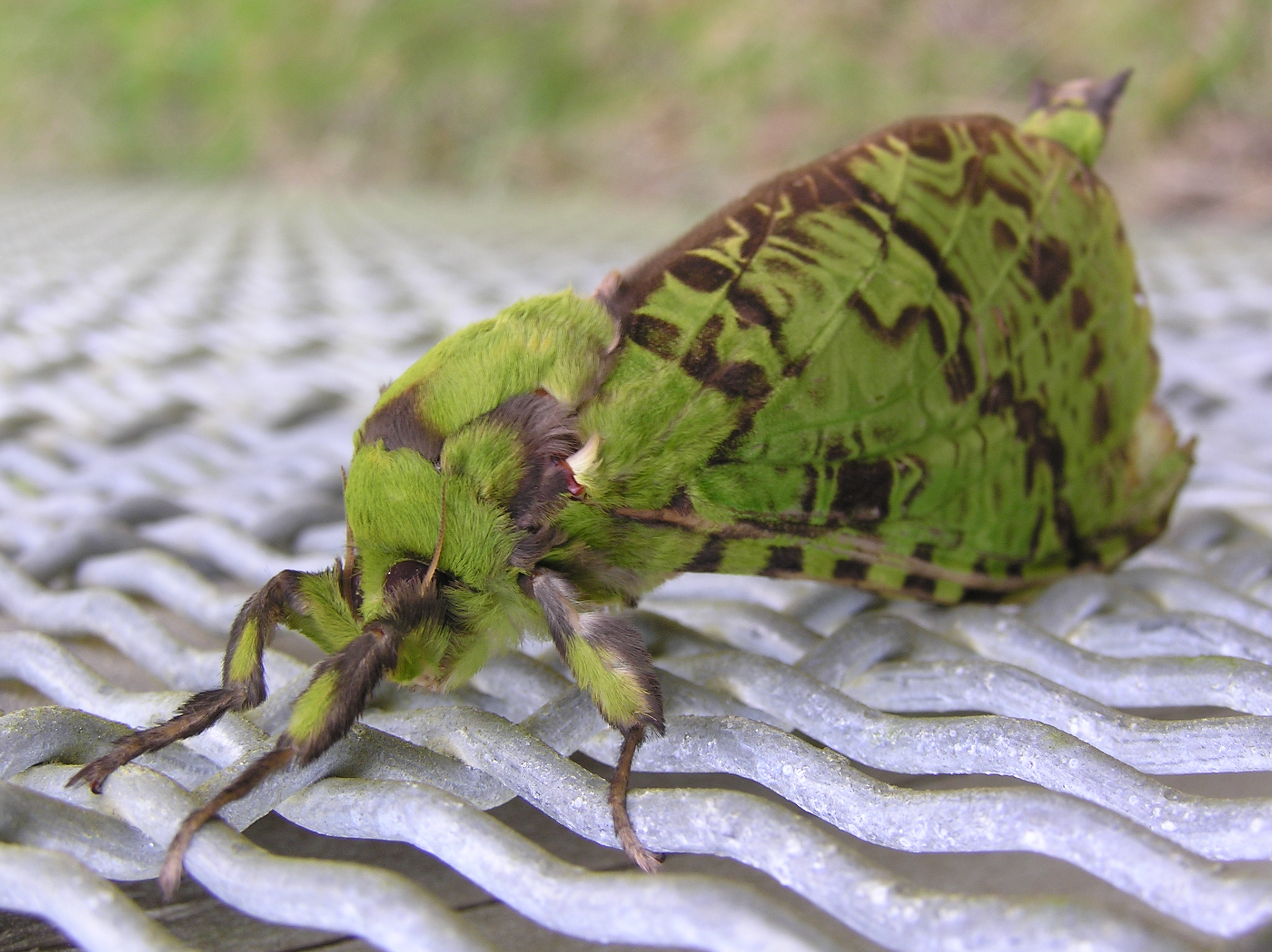
- Puriri moth (Aenetus virescens)

Scientific classification
- Kingdom: Animalia
- Phylum: Arthropoda
- Clade: Pancrustacea
- Class: Insecta
- Order: Lepidoptera
- Family: Hepialidae
- Genus: Aenetus; Herrich-Schäffer, 1855

Species
- See text.

Synonyms
- Charagia Walker, 1856; Phloiopsyche Scott, 1864; Oenetus Kirby, 1892; Choragia Pagenstecher, 1909; Oenetes Oke, 1953

= Aenetus =

Genus of moths

Aenetus is a genus of moths of the family Hepialidae. There are 24 described species found in Indonesia, New Guinea, New Caledonia, Australia and New Zealand. Most species have green or blue forewings and reddish hindwings, but some are predominantly brown or white. The larvae feed in the trunks of living trees, burrowing horizontally into the trunk, then vertically down.

== Species ==
- Aenetus arfaki (New Guinea)
- Aenetus astathes (Western Australia)
- Aenetus bilineatus (New Guinea)
- Aenetus blackburnii - Blackburn's ghost moth (South Australia; Victoria, Australia)
- Aenetus cohici (New Caledonia)
- Aenetus crameri (New Guinea)
- Aenetus dulcis (Western Australia)
  - Food plant: Agonis
- Aenetus djernaesae (Western Australia )
- Aenetus edwardsi (Queensland, Australia)
- Aenetus eugyna (New Guinea)
- Aenetus eximia - common ghost moth (southern Queensland to Victoria, Australia)
  - Recorded food plants: Daphnandra, Dodonaea, Doryphora, Eucalyptus, Glochidion, Nothofagus, Prostanthera, Waterhousea
- Aenetus hampsoni (New Guinea)
- Aenetus lewinii (southern Queensland to New South Wales, Australia)
  - Recorded food plants: Casuarina, Leptospermum
- Aenetus ligniveren - common splendid ghost moth (Southern Queensland to South Australia)
  - Recorded food plants: Acacia, Acmena, Callistemon, Dodonaea, Eucalyptus, Lantana, Leptospermum, Lophostemon, Malus, Melaleuca, Olearia, Pomaderris, Prostanthera, Rubus
- Aenetus marginatus (New Guinea)
- Aenetus mirabilis - North Queensland swift moth (Queensland)
  - Food plant: Alphitonia
- Aenetus montanus (Victoria and New South Wales, Australia)
  - Food plant: Eucalyptus
- Aenetus ombraloma (Tasmania)
  - Food plant: Eucalyptus
- Aenetus ramsayi (Queensland and New South Wales)
  - Recorded food plants: Diploglottis, Eucalyptus
- Aenetus scotti (Queensland and New South Wales, Australia)
  - Recorded food plants: Daphnandra, Dendrocnide, Diploglottis, Eucalyptus, Lantana, Tetradium
- Aenetus scripta (Western Australia)
- Aenetus sordida (New Guinea)
- Aenetus splendens (southern Queensland and New South Wales Australia)

Recorded food plants: Callicoma, Casuarina, Eugenia, Trema

- Aenetus sumatraensis (Sumatra, Indonesia)
- Aenetus tegulatus (Indonesia, New Guinea)
- Aenetus tephroptilus (Western Australia)
- Aenetus thermistis (northern Australia)
- Aenetus tindalei (South Australia)
- Aenetus toxopeusi (New Guinea)
- Aenetus virescens - puriri moth (North Island, New Zealand) (New Zealand's largest native moth)
  - Recorded food plants: Carpodetus, Citrus, Cornus, Eucalyptus, Malus, Nothofagus, oak, Prunus, willow
