= Aenetus crameri =

Scientific classification
- Kingdom: Animalia
- Phylum: Arthropoda
- Class: Insecta
- Order: Lepidoptera
- Family: Hepialidae
- Genus: Aenetus
- Species: A. crameri

Binomial name
- Aenetus crameri Viette, 1956

Species of moth

Aenetus crameri is a moth of the family Hepialidae. It is known from New Guinea.
