= Aenetus scotti =

Scientific classification
- Kingdom: Animalia
- Phylum: Arthropoda
- Clade: Pancrustacea
- Class: Insecta
- Order: Lepidoptera
- Family: Hepialidae
- Genus: Aenetus
- Species: A. scotti

Binomial name
- Aenetus scotti (Scott, 1869)

Synonyms
- Charagia scotti Scott, 1869; Hepialus daphnandrae Lucas, 1891

Species of moth

Aenetus scotti is a moth of the family Hepialidae. It is known from New South Wales and Queensland.
