= Aenetus toxopeusi =

Scientific classification
- Kingdom: Animalia
- Phylum: Arthropoda
- Class: Insecta
- Order: Lepidoptera
- Family: Hepialidae
- Genus: Aenetus
- Species: A. toxopeusi

Binomial name
- Aenetus toxopeusi Viette, 1956

Species of moth

Aenetus toxopeusi is a moth of the family Hepialidae. It is known from New Guinea.
