= Aenetus tegulatus =

Scientific classification
- Kingdom: Animalia
- Phylum: Arthropoda
- Clade: Pancrustacea
- Class: Insecta
- Order: Lepidoptera
- Family: Hepialidae
- Genus: Aenetus
- Species: A. tegulatus

Binomial name
- Aenetus tegulatus (Pagenstecher, 1888)

Synonyms
- Hepialus tegulatus Pagenstecher, 1888; Hepialus rosatus Pagenstecher, 1888; Hepialus cyanochlora Lower, 1894; Hepialus thermistis Lower, 1894; Charagia walsinghami Olliff, 1895

Species of moth

Aenetus tegulatus is a moth of the family Hepialidae. It is known from south-eastern Papua New Guinea, the Northern Territory and Queensland.

Young larvae feed on dead leaves. Older larvae bore in the stems of saplings of various plants, including Allocasuarina littoralis and Glochidion disparides.
