= Aenetus tephroptilus =

Scientific classification
- Kingdom: Animalia
- Phylum: Arthropoda
- Clade: Pancrustacea
- Class: Insecta
- Order: Lepidoptera
- Family: Hepialidae
- Genus: Aenetus
- Species: A. tephroptilus

Binomial name
- Aenetus tephroptilus (Turner, 1915)

Synonyms
- Hepialus tephroptilus Turner, 1915

Species of moth

Aenetus tephroptilus is a moth of the family Hepialidae. It is known from Western Australia.
