= Aenetus ramsayi =

Scientific classification
- Kingdom: Animalia
- Phylum: Arthropoda
- Clade: Pancrustacea
- Class: Insecta
- Order: Lepidoptera
- Family: Hepialidae
- Genus: Aenetus
- Species: A. ramsayi

Binomial name
- Aenetus ramsayi (Scott, 1869)

Synonyms
- Charagia ramsayi Scott, 1869

Species of moth

Aenetus ramsayi, the swift ghost moth, is a moth of the family Hepialidae. It is known from Queensland and New South Wales.

The wingspan is 100 mm for females and 80 mm for males. Adults are on wing from February to March.

The larvae feed on various trees and saplings, including Diploglottis australis, Alectryon, Syzygium smithii and Eucalyptus grandis. They bore in the stem of their host plant.
