= Aenetus sordida =

Scientific classification
- Kingdom: Animalia
- Phylum: Arthropoda
- Class: Insecta
- Order: Lepidoptera
- Family: Hepialidae
- Genus: Aenetus
- Species: A. sordida

Binomial name
- Aenetus sordida (Rothschild & Jordan, 1905)

Synonyms
- Achladaeus sordida Rothschild & Jordan, 1905

Species of moth

Aenetus sordida is a moth of the family Hepialidae. It is known from New Guinea.
