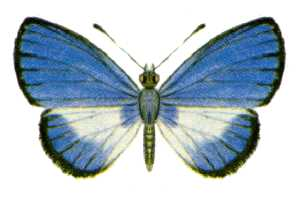

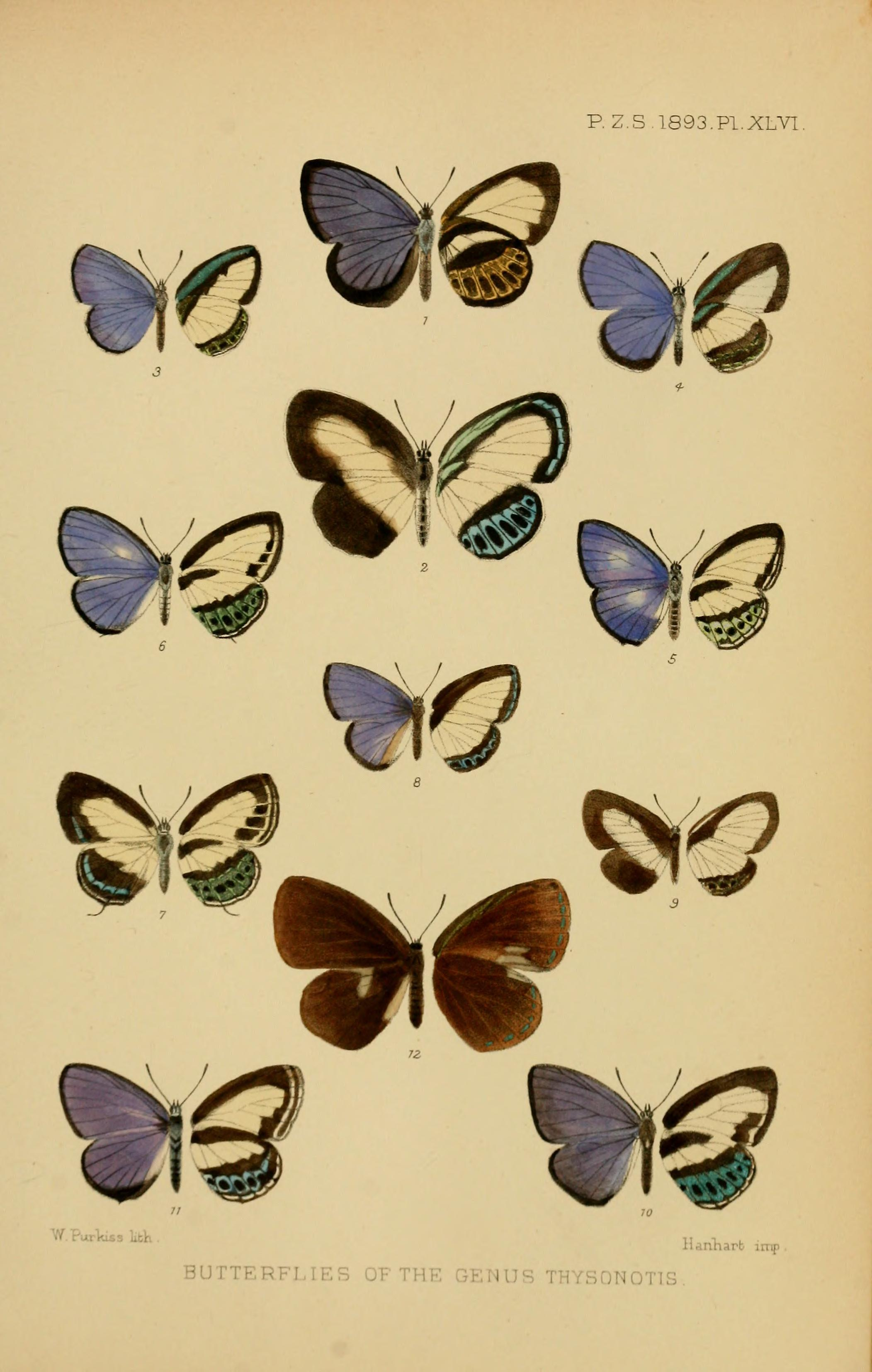
- Fig. 3 male

Scientific classification
- Kingdom: Animalia
- Phylum: Arthropoda
- Class: Insecta
- Order: Lepidoptera
- Family: Lycaenidae
- Genus: Psychonotis
- Species: P. caelius

Binomial name
- Psychonotis caelius (C. & R. Felder, 1860)

Synonyms
- Lycaena caelius C. & R. Felder, 1860; Psychonotis hymetus taygetus C. & R. Felder, 1865; Psychonotis hymetus taletum Waterhouse & Lyell, 1914; Psychonotis hymetus salamandri Macleay, 1866; Thysonotis hanno Grose-Smith, 1894; Thysonotis irregularis Ribbe, 1899; Thysonotis moutoni Ribbe, 1899; Thysonotis korion Druce & Bethune-Baker, 1893; Thysonotis hymetus manusi Rothschild, 1915; Danis caelius mayae D'Abrera, 1971; Thysonotis plateni Grose-Smith & Kirby, [1896]; Thysonotis plotinus Grose-Smith & Kirby, [1896]; Thysonotis ekeikei Bethune-Baker, 1908; Thysonotis aetius Fruhstorfer, 1915; Thysonotis coelinus Grose-Smith, 1898

= Psychonotis caelius =

Species of butterfly

Psychonotis caelius, the small green banded blue, is a species of butterfly of the family Lycaenidae. It is found in New Guinea and adjacent islands and along the eastern coast of Australia.

== Subspecies ==
- P. c. caelius (Aru, Australia)
- P. c. hanno (Grose-Smith, 1894) (New Britain)
- P. c. korion (H. H. Druce and Bethune-Baker, 1893) (Kai Islands)
- P. c. manusi (Rothschild, 1915) (Admiralty Islands)
- P. c. mayae (D'Abrera, 1971) (Louisiades)
- P. c. plateni (Grose-Smith and Kirby, [1896]) (Waigeu)
- P. c. plotinus (Grose-Smith and Kirby, [1896]) (Papua New Guinea)

== Habitat ==
Psychonotis caelius are found in rainforests as well as parks, gardens and gullies with established host plants.

=== Host Plants ===
The larvae of Psychonotis caelius feed on the leaves of Alphitonia excelsa.
