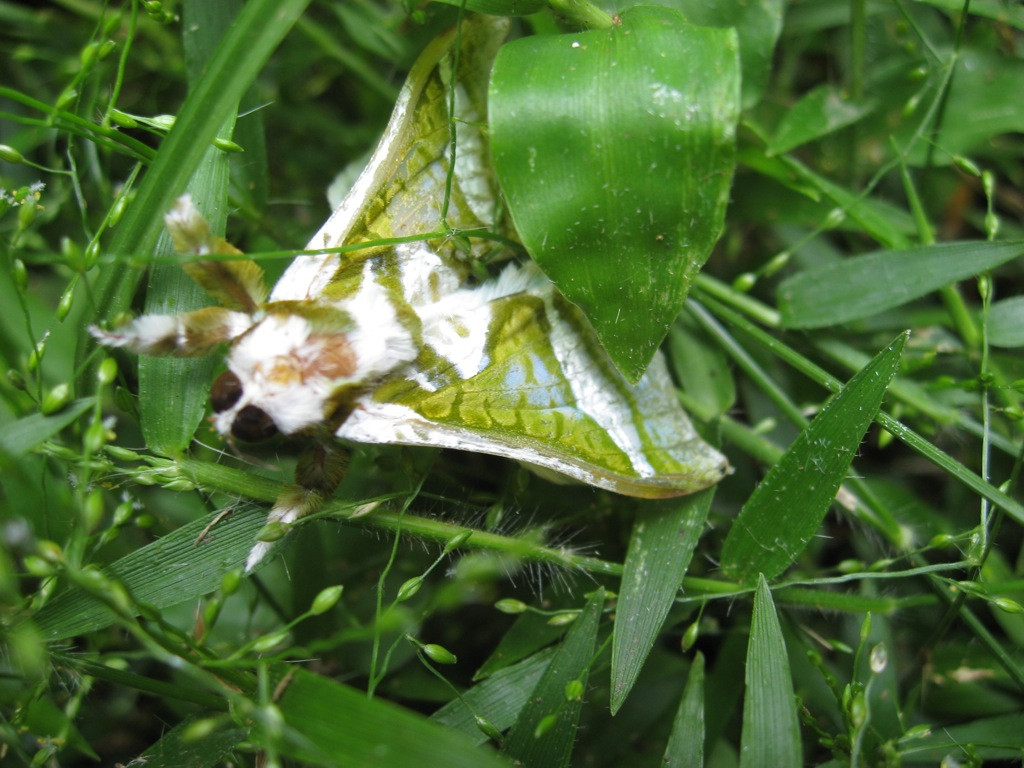

Scientific classification
- Domain: Eukaryota
- Kingdom: Animalia
- Phylum: Arthropoda
- Class: Insecta
- Order: Lepidoptera
- Family: Hepialidae
- Genus: Aenetus
- Species: A. ligniveren

Binomial name
- Aenetus ligniveren (Lewin, 1805)

Synonyms
- Hepialus ligniveren Lewin, J.W. 1805; Phloiopsyche venusta Scott, A.W. 1864

= Aenetus ligniveren =

Species of moth

Aenetus ligniveren, the common splendid ghost moth, is a moth in the family Hepialidae. It is found from southern Queensland to Tasmania.

The wingspan is 50 mm for males and 70 mm for females. Adults emerge in early summer.

The larvae have been recorded feeding on Acacia, Acmena, Callistemon, Dodonaea, Eucalyptus, Lantana, Leptospermum, Lophostemon, Malus, Melaleuca, Olearia, Pomaderris, Prostanthera and Rubus species.

== See also ==
Aenetus eximia
