= Aenetus mirabilis =

Scientific classification
- Kingdom: Animalia
- Phylum: Arthropoda
- Clade: Pancrustacea
- Class: Insecta
- Order: Lepidoptera
- Family: Hepialidae
- Genus: Aenetus
- Species: A. mirabilis

Binomial name
- Aenetus mirabilis Rothschild, 1894

Synonyms
- Oenetus mirabilis

Species of moth

Aenetus mirabilis is a moth of the family Hepialidae. It is known from Queensland.

The larvae feed on Alphitonia species. They bore in the stems of trees and saplings.
