= Aenetus eugyna =

Scientific classification
- Domain: Eukaryota
- Kingdom: Animalia
- Phylum: Arthropoda
- Class: Insecta
- Order: Lepidoptera
- Family: Hepialidae
- Genus: Aenetus
- Species: A. eugyna

Binomial name
- Aenetus eugyna (Rothschild & Jordan, 1907)

Synonyms
- Charagia eugyna Rothschild & Jordan, 1907

Species of moth

Aenetus eugyna is a moth of the family Hepialidae. It is known from New Guinea.
