= Aenetus astathes =

Scientific classification
- Domain: Eukaryota
- Kingdom: Animalia
- Phylum: Arthropoda
- Class: Insecta
- Order: Lepidoptera
- Family: Hepialidae
- Genus: Aenetus
- Species: A. astathes

Binomial name
- Aenetus astathes (Turner, 1915)

Synonyms
- Hepialus astathes Turner, 1915

Species of moth

Aenetus astathes is a moth of the family Hepialidae. It is known from Australia.

The larvae have been recorded feeding on Casuarina species. Adults have been recorded in February.
