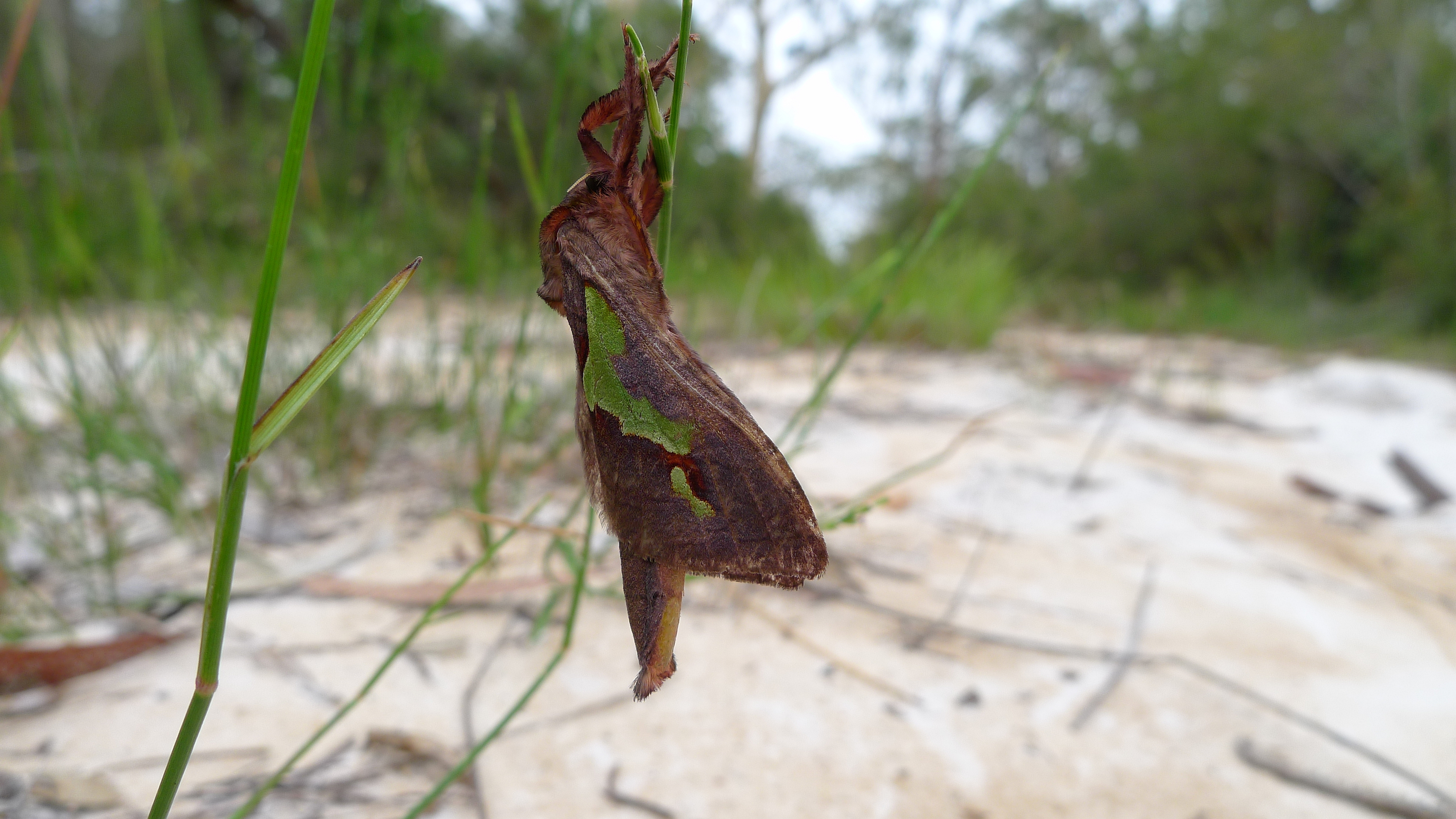
- Female Aenetus lewinii

Scientific classification
- Kingdom: Animalia
- Phylum: Arthropoda
- Clade: Pancrustacea
- Class: Insecta
- Order: Lepidoptera
- Family: Hepialidae
- Genus: Aenetus
- Species: A. lewinii

Binomial name
- Aenetus lewinii (Walker, 1856)

Synonyms
- Charagia lewinii Walker, 1856; Charagia lamberti Walker, 1856

= Aenetus lewinii =

Species of moth

Aenetus lewinii is a moth of the family Hepialidae. It is known from New South Wales and Queensland.

The larvae feed on various trees, including Casuarina and Leptospermum species. They bore in the stems of saplings.
