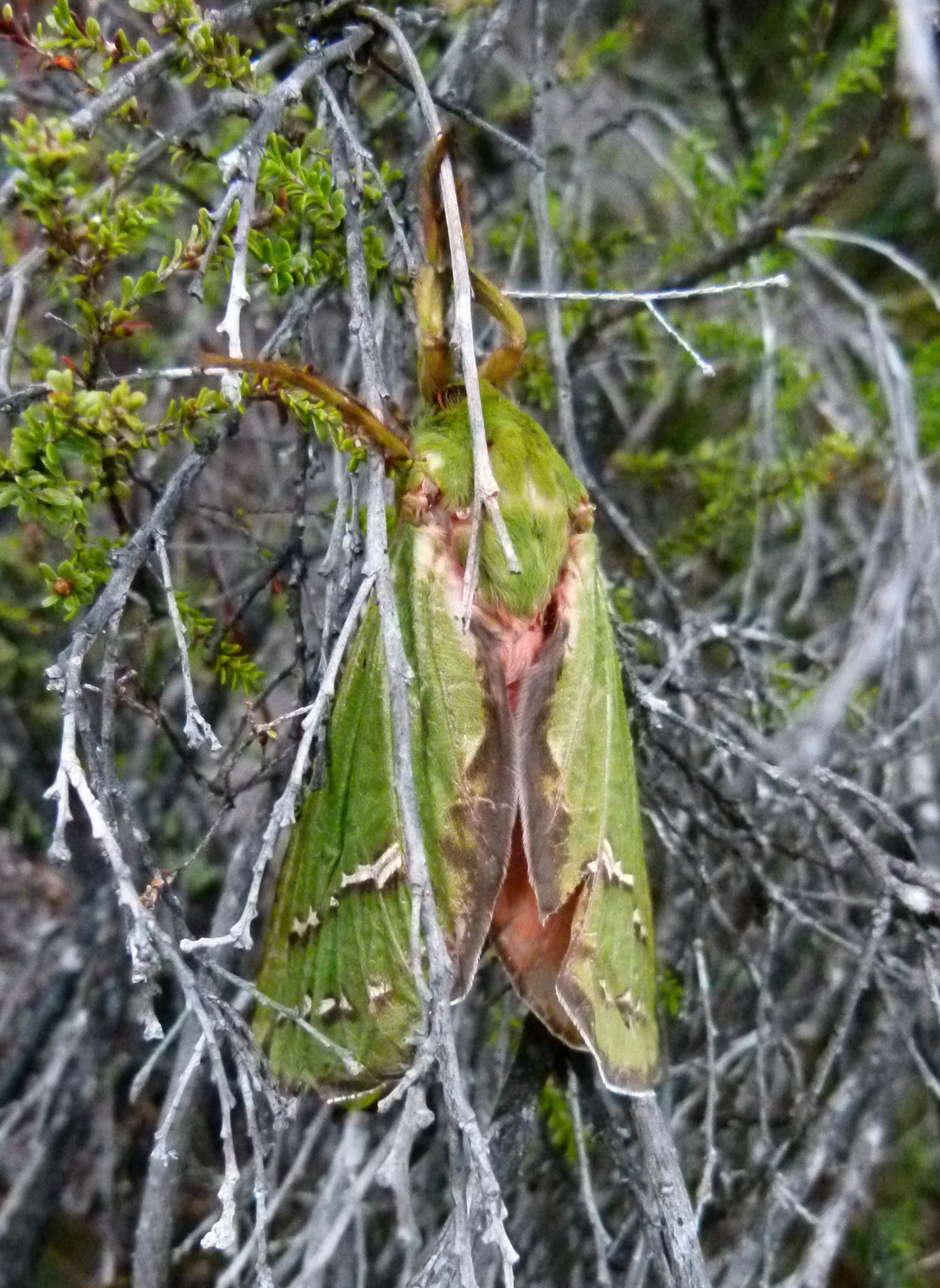

Scientific classification
- Kingdom: Animalia
- Phylum: Arthropoda
- Clade: Pancrustacea
- Class: Insecta
- Order: Lepidoptera
- Family: Hepialidae
- Genus: Aenetus
- Species: A. dulcis

Binomial name
- Aenetus dulcis (C. Swinhoe, 1892)

Synonyms
- Charagia dulcis C. Swinhoe, 1892; Charagia celsissima Olliff, 1895; Charagia jordani Pfitzner, 1909

= Aenetus dulcis =

Species of moth

Aenetus dulcis is a moth of the family Hepialidae first described by Charles Swinhoe in 1892. It is known from Western Australia.

The wingspan is about 110 mm.

The larvae feed on Agonis flexuosa. They bore in the stem of their host plant.
