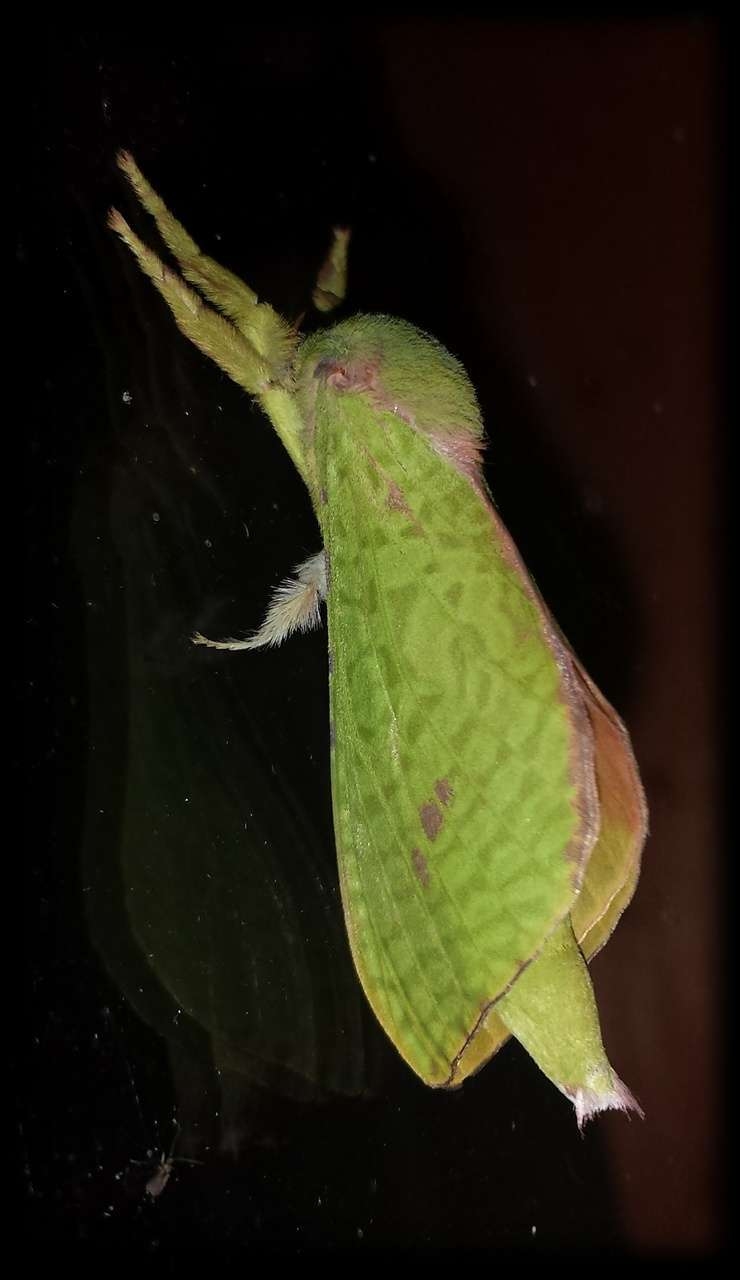

Scientific classification
- Kingdom: Animalia
- Phylum: Arthropoda
- Clade: Pancrustacea
- Class: Insecta
- Order: Lepidoptera
- Family: Hepialidae
- Genus: Aenetus
- Species: A. eximia

Binomial name
- Aenetus eximia (Scott, 1869)

Synonyms
- Charagia eximia Scott, 1869; Hepialus hilaris Lucas, 1891; Charagia pomalis Swinhoe, 1892; Charagia coreeba Olliff, 1895

= Aenetus eximia =

Species of moth

Aenetus eximia is a moth of the family Hepialidae. It is known from southern Queensland, Australia, to Tasmania.

The larvae feed on a wide range of plants, including Syzygium smithii, Eucalyptus grandis, Waterhousea floribunda, Tristaniopsis, Doryphora sassafrass, Daphnandra micrantha, Glochidion ferdinandi, Nothofagus moorei, Prostanthera lasianthos, Dodonaea viscosa, Diploglottis australis, Pomaderris aspera, Dendrocnide excelsa, Lantana camara and Olearia argophylla. They live in tunnels and dig down into the trunk and root of their host plant. Pupation takes place inside the tunnel.

== See also ==
Aenetus ligniveren
