= Aenetus cohici =

Scientific classification
- Kingdom: Animalia
- Phylum: Arthropoda
- Class: Insecta
- Order: Lepidoptera
- Family: Hepialidae
- Genus: Aenetus
- Species: A. cohici

Binomial name
- Aenetus cohici Viette, 1961

Species of moth

Aenetus cohici is a moth of the family Hepialidae. It is endemic to New Caledonia.
