= Aenetus montanus =

Scientific classification
- Kingdom: Animalia
- Phylum: Arthropoda
- Clade: Pancrustacea
- Class: Insecta
- Order: Lepidoptera
- Family: Hepialidae
- Genus: Aenetus
- Species: A. montanus

Binomial name
- Aenetus montanus (Tindale, 1953)

Synonyms
- Oenetus montanus Tindale, 1953

Species of moth

Aenetus montanus is a moth of the family Hepialidae. It is known from the Australian Capital Territory and New South Wales.

The larvae feed on Eucalyptus pauciflora, subspecies pauciflora and niphophila. They bore in trees and saplings.
