= Aenetus arfaki =

Scientific classification
- Kingdom: Animalia
- Phylum: Arthropoda
- Clade: Pancrustacea
- Class: Insecta
- Order: Lepidoptera
- Family: Hepialidae
- Genus: Aenetus
- Species: A. arfaki

Binomial name
- Aenetus arfaki Bethune-Baker, 1910

Synonyms
- Charagia ninayana Pfitzner, 1914

Species of moth

Aenetus arfaki is a moth of the family Hepialidae described by George Thomas Bethune-Baker in 1910. It is known from the Arfak Mountains in New Guinea.
