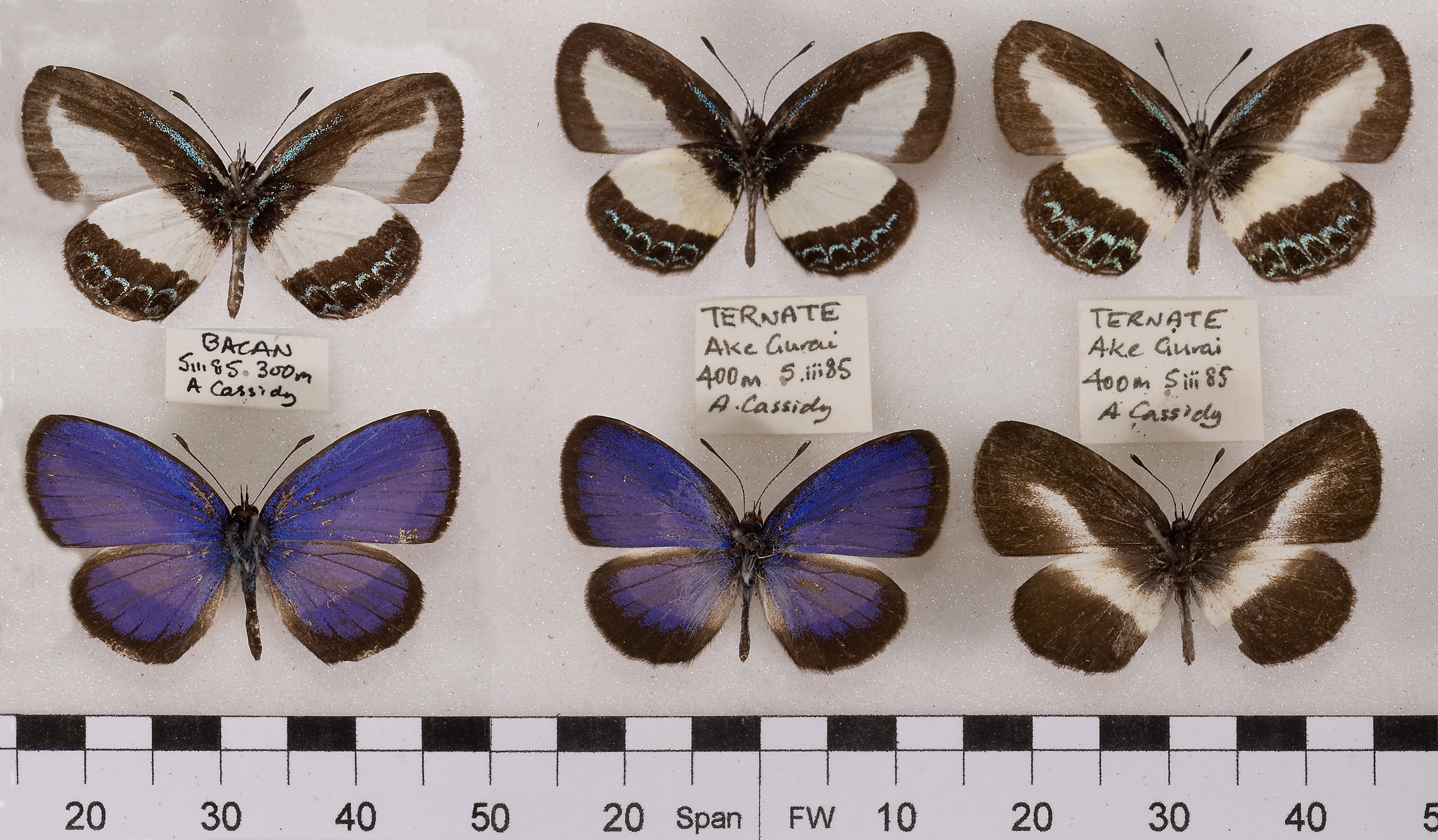
- Psychonotis eudocia

Scientific classification
- Domain: Eukaryota
- Kingdom: Animalia
- Phylum: Arthropoda
- Class: Insecta
- Order: Lepidoptera
- Family: Lycaenidae
- Subfamily: Polyommatinae
- Tribe: Polyommatini
- Genus: Psychonotis; Toxopeus, 1930

= Psychonotis =

Butterfly genus in family Lycaenidae

Psychonotis is a genus of butterflies in the family Lycaenidae. The species of this genus are found in the Australasian realm.

== Species ==
- Psychonotis brownii (Druce & Bethune-Baker, 1893)
- Psychonotis caelius (C. & R. Felder, 1860)
- Psychonotis eleanor Tennent, 1999
- Psychonotis eudocia (H. H. Druce and Bethune-Baker, 1893)
- Psychonotis finisterre C.J. Müller, 2003
- Psychonotis hebes (Druce, 1904)
- Psychonotis hymetus (C. Felder, 1860)
- Psychonotis julie Tennent, 1999
- Psychonotis kruera (Druce, 1891)
- Psychonotis marginalis C.J. Müller, 2003
- Psychonotis melane (Joicey & Talbot, 1916)
- Psychonotis parsonsi C.J. Müller, 2003
- Psychonotis piepersii (Snellen, 1878)
- Psychonotis purpurea (Druce, [1903])
- Psychonotis slithyi Tennent, 1999
- Psychonotis waihuru Tennent, 1999
