= Aenetus hampsoni =

Scientific classification
- Domain: Eukaryota
- Kingdom: Animalia
- Phylum: Arthropoda
- Class: Insecta
- Order: Lepidoptera
- Family: Hepialidae
- Genus: Aenetus
- Species: A. hampsoni

Binomial name
- Aenetus hampsoni (Joicey & Noakes, 1914)

Synonyms
- Charagia hampsoni Joicey & Noakes, 1914

Species of moth

Aenetus hampsoni is a moth of the family Hepialidae. It is known from New Guinea.
