= Aenetus ombraloma =

Scientific classification
- Kingdom: Animalia
- Phylum: Arthropoda
- Clade: Pancrustacea
- Class: Insecta
- Order: Lepidoptera
- Family: Hepialidae
- Genus: Aenetus
- Species: A. ombraloma

Binomial name
- Aenetus ombraloma (Lower, 1902)

Synonyms
- Hepialus ombraloma Lower, 1902; Oenetes taggi Oke, 1953; Oenetus paradiseus Tindale, 1953

Species of moth

Aenetus ombraloma is a moth of the family Hepialidae. It is known from Tasmania.

The wingspan is about 60 mm.

The larvae feed on Eucalyptus obliqua, Eucalyptus regnans and Eucalyptus johnstonii. They bore in the stem of their host plant. They cover the entrance to their tunnel with a web of silk. Pupation takes place inside the tunnel.
