= Alphitonia franguloides =

Scientific classification
- Kingdom: Plantae
- Clade: Tracheophytes
- Clade: Angiosperms
- Clade: Eudicots
- Clade: Rosids
- Order: Rosales
- Family: Rhamnaceae
- Genus: Alphitonia
- Species: A. franguloides

Binomial name
- Alphitonia franguloides A.Gray

Varieties
- Alphitonia franguloides var. franguloides; Alphitonia franguloides var. obtusa A.Gray

Synonyms
- Alphitonia excelsa var. franguloides (A.Gray) F.M.Bailey

Species of plant

Alphitonia franguloides is a species of flowering plant in the family Rhamnaceae. It is a shrub or tree native to Fiji and Tonga.

Two varieties are accepted.

- Alphitonia franguloides var. franguloides – Fiji
- Alphitonia franguloides var. obtusa A.Gray – Tonga
