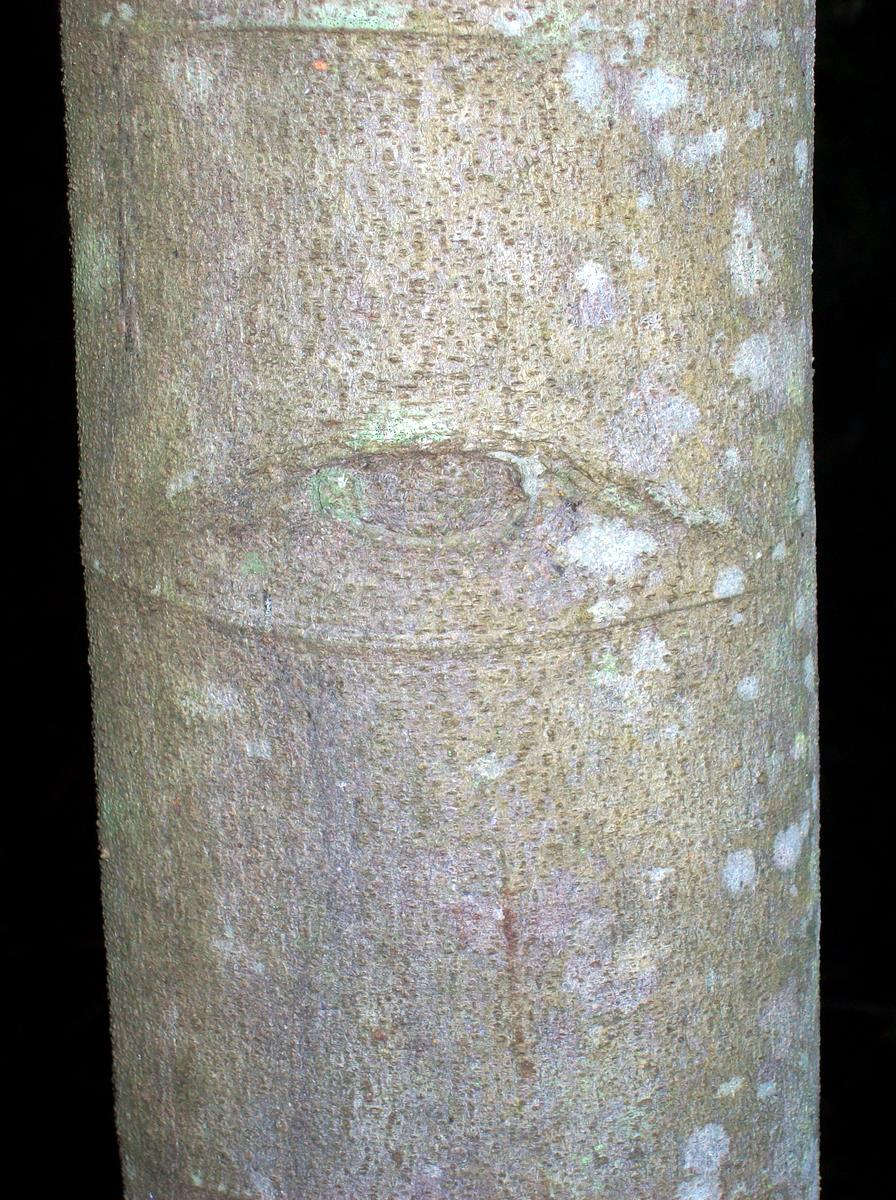

Conservation status
- Least Concern (IUCN 3.1)

Scientific classification
- Kingdom: Plantae
- Clade: Tracheophytes
- Clade: Angiosperms
- Clade: Eudicots
- Clade: Rosids
- Order: Rosales
- Family: Rhamnaceae
- Genus: Alphitonia
- Species: A. petriei

Binomial name
- Alphitonia petriei Braid & C.T.White

= Alphitonia petriei =

White Ash

Species of tree in the family Rhamnaceae

Alphitonia petriei, commonly known as the white ash, is a rainforest tree in the family Rhamnaceae from eastern and northern Australia. Other common names include red ash, white-leaf, pink almond and pink ash. It was originally collected from the Johnstone River in October 1917 by H. Ladbrook, but the designated type for this species was collected by Cyril Tenison (C.T.) White in March 1922 from the Barron River near Kuranda. It was described and named in 1925 by K.W. Braid and White who assigned the species epithet petriei in honour of W.R. Petrie, who alerted them to its distinctness.

Alphitonia petriei is usually found as a small tree around 20 metres (66 feet) tall. However, it has been recorded at 40 metres (130 feet) tall with a stem diameter of 60 cm in Queensland. The trunk and larger branches bear fissured grey bark (darker brown in Queensland), and peeling or bruising of it gives off a strong scent of liniment, which has been likened to oil of wintergreen. Arranged alternately on the smaller branches, simple narrow leaves measure 7–15 cm (3–6 in) in length and are dark glossy green above and covered with fine white hairs underneath. The tiny (0.5 cm diameter) creamy flowers have five petals and are found in panicles at the end of branchlets or between leaves. Flowering occurs in September to November, followed by the production of globular dark fruit around 1 to 1.5 cm diameter from February to July.

It is found in coastal rainforest, and in ecotone areas in eucalyptus forest from Darwin and Thursday Island in northern Australia south along the eastern coastline to the Upper Orara River in New South Wales. The leaves and shoots are eaten by farm animals.
