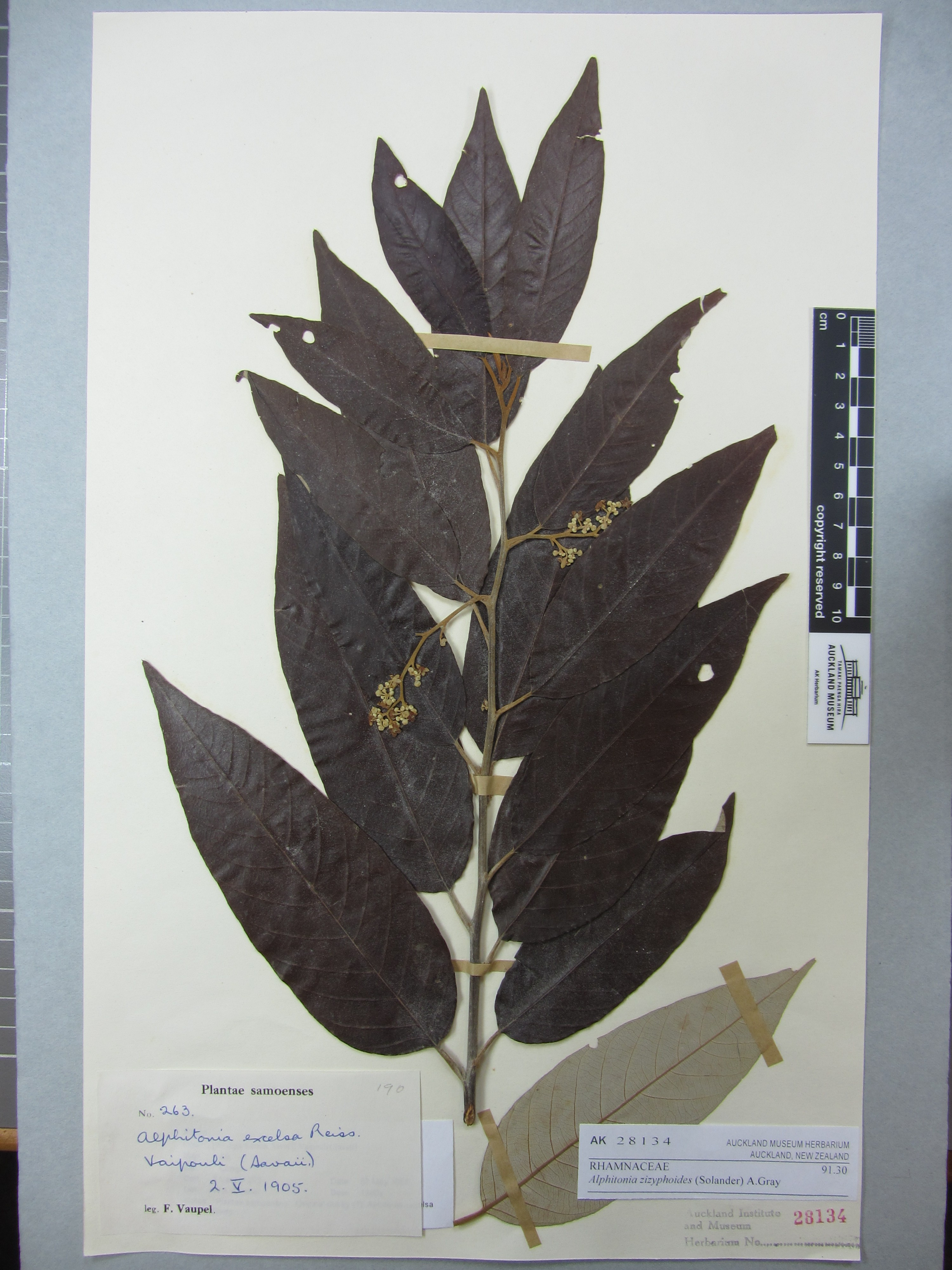

Conservation status
- Least Concern (IUCN 3.1)

Scientific classification
- Kingdom: Plantae
- Clade: Tracheophytes
- Clade: Angiosperms
- Clade: Eudicots
- Clade: Rosids
- Order: Rosales
- Family: Rhamnaceae
- Genus: Alphitonia
- Species: A. zizyphoides

Binomial name
- Alphitonia zizyphoides (Biehler) A.Gray (1854)

Synonyms
- Pomaderris zizyphoides (Biehler) Hook. & Arn. (1832); Rhamnus zizyphoides Biehler (1807)

= Alphitonia zizyphoides =

Species of flowering plant

Alphitonia zizyphoides is a species of flowering plant in the buckthorn family, Rhamnaceae. It is a tree native to the Cook Islands, Fiji, Niue, the Samoan Islands, the Society Islands, Tonga, Vanuatu, and Wallis and Futuna.

== Taxonomy ==
Alphitonia zizyphoides was formally described in 1854 by the American botanist Asa Gray. The species is known by a number of indigenous names throughout its range, including doi, doi damu, and doi selawa in Fiji; navasvas, napoth, vilvile, nevilvil, aurie, vihumeri, neho, dove, ondova, reha, nampou, nafa, and nahmah in Vanuatu; manee and toi in French Polynesia; and toi in Samoa, Tonga, Niue, and Wallis and Futuna.

Alphitonia zizyphoides is part of a complex alongside several others in its genus, such as A. franguloides, A. excelsa, A. ponderosa, and A. marquesensis, with some authorities preferring to treat all of these taxa as a single species.

== Description ==
In suitable habitats, Alphitonia zizyphoides trees are generally medium-large, growing to heights of 20–25 m (66–82 ft), with the tallest specimens growing as high as 30 m (98 ft). In unsuitable environments, the tree can become stunted, resulting in dwarf individuals with heights of just 1–2 m (3–7 ft). Full-grown trees have crown diameters of 10–15 m (33–49 ft). The trees have oval- or spear-shaped leaves that are dark green above and greyish-green below. The leaves are 5–18 cm (2–7 in) long and 3–6.5 cm (1–3 in) across. The leaves' stalks are 1.5–2.5 cm (0.6–1 in) long and have orange-brown hairs that eventually change color to blackish-green. Flowers inflorescences grow near the tips of branches and are composed of five small flowers with white petals and pale green sepals. Flowering occurs year-round and trees usually begin producing flowers after reaching an age of three or four years.

After pollination, flowers develop into round drupes that are 6–9 mm (0.2–0.4 in) across. Raw fruits are green and gradually change to a brownish-black colour as they ripen. Upon complete ripening, the fruit's flesh shrivels up and falls off, leaving behind two seeds covered by reddish-brown arils. These seeds are brown and measure around 4 mm (0.2 in) across. They are dispersed by birds.

== Distribution and ecology ==
Alphitonia zizyphoides is a widespread and common native of the South Pacific.

== Relationship with humans ==
Alphitonia zizyphoides is used in construction, as firewood, and in traditional medicine (where its bark and sap are used). Due to its large range and the absence of any major threats, Alphitonia zizyphoides is classified as being of least concern on the IUCN Red List.
