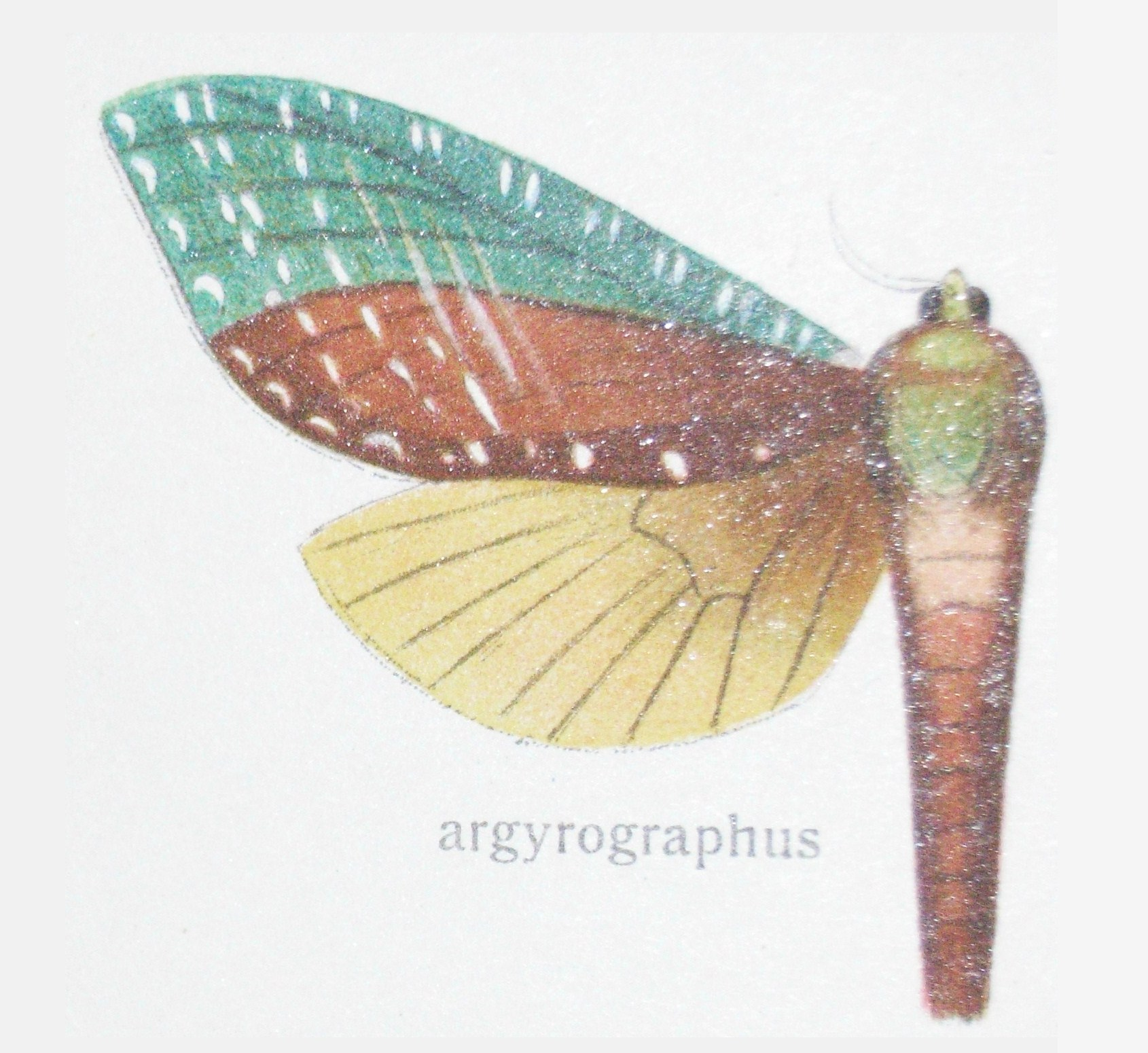

Scientific classification
- Domain: Eukaryota
- Kingdom: Animalia
- Phylum: Arthropoda
- Class: Insecta
- Order: Lepidoptera
- Family: Hepialidae
- Genus: Aenetus
- Species: A. scripta

Binomial name
- Aenetus scripta (Scott, 1869)

Synonyms
- Charagia scripta Scott, 1869; Charagia argyrographa R. Felder, 1874; Charagia argyrodines Pfitzner, 1914

= Aenetus scripta =

Species of moth

Aenetus scripta is a species of moth of the family Hepialidae. It is endemic to south-western Australia.

The wingspan is about 80 mm. The hindwings are blue in males and yellow in females.
