= Aenetus blackburnii =

Scientific classification
- Kingdom: Animalia
- Phylum: Arthropoda
- Class: Insecta
- Order: Lepidoptera
- Family: Hepialidae
- Genus: Aenetus
- Species: A. blackburnii

Binomial name
- Aenetus blackburnii (Lower, 1892)

Synonyms
- Hepialus blackburnii Lower, 1892

Species of moth

Aenetus blackburnii (Blackburn's ghost moth) is a moth of the family Hepialidae. It is known from Australia, where it is widely distributed.

Adults have been recorded from March to April.
