= Aenetus marginatus =

Scientific classification
- Domain: Eukaryota
- Kingdom: Animalia
- Phylum: Arthropoda
- Class: Insecta
- Order: Lepidoptera
- Family: Hepialidae
- Genus: Aenetus
- Species: A. marginatus

Binomial name
- Aenetus marginatus (Rothschild, 1896)

Synonyms
- Oenetus marginatus; Oenetus misimanus Rothschild, 1898; Oenetus saturatior Rothschild, 1915; Charagia eugynoides Strand, 1912

Species of moth

Aenetus marginatus is a moth of the family Hepialidae. It is known from New Guinea.
