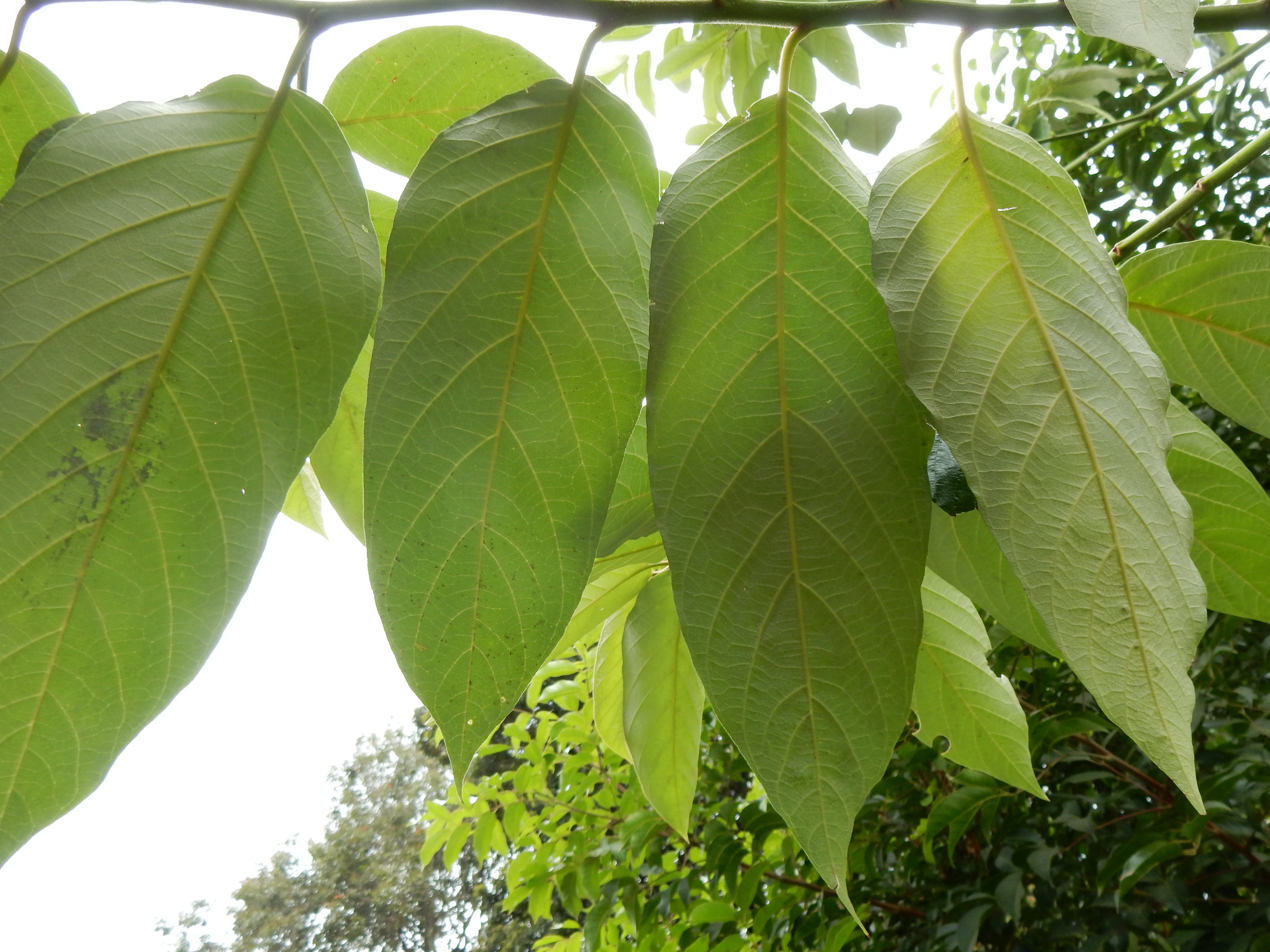

Conservation status
- Least Concern (IUCN 3.1)

Scientific classification
- Kingdom: Plantae
- Clade: Tracheophytes
- Clade: Angiosperms
- Clade: Eudicots
- Clade: Rosids
- Order: Rosales
- Family: Rhamnaceae
- Genus: Alphitonia
- Species: A. whitei

Binomial name
- Alphitonia whitei Braid

= Alphitonia whitei =

Species of flowering tree, endemic to Queensland, Australia

Alphitonia whitei is a species of flowering tree in the family Rhamnaceae, that is endemic to Queensland in Australia. It is locally known as red ash, red almond or sarsaparilla. When twigs or leaves are broken, a sarsaparilla or liniment type scent is emitted.

A small to mid sized tropical rainforest species which grows in a variety of sites, from near the coast to 1,200 metres above sea level. It may reach a height of 20 metres with a stem diameter of 30 cm. Unlike others in the Alphitonia group, it thrives in low light situations and is not as often seen in high light environments as in rainforest margins.

Leaves form with large stipules, 5 mm by 1 mm long, and fall off in the later stages of leaf development. Leaf stems are grooved or channeled on the upper side. Leaves may grow up to 21 cm long and 7 cm wide. Glossy green above, with a veiny whitish underside. The specific epithet may refer to this or to the botanist C.T. White. Young shoots have soft reddish brown hairs.

Flowers form from September to November. Flowers grow to around 5 mm in diameter, with cream to pale green petals, which are 1 to 1.2 mm long. The stamens are enveloped in the petals. Sepals are about 2 mm long. Fruit grow to about 6 to 10 mm in diameter, forming between January and April. The mesocarp is not powdery at maturity. Black coloured fruit are somewhat round in shape, and are eaten by fig parrots and the cassowary. Leaves are food for Lumholtz's tree-kangaroo, green ringtail possum and Herbert River ringtail possum.

The Red Ash produces a useful general purpose timber with a specific gravity of 0.77. Betulinic acid is found in the leaves, wood and bark. This plant appeared in scientific literature in 1932, published by the botanist K.W. Braid. The type specimens were collected from Jordan Creek near Innisfail and Barron River near Kuranda, the latter by F.M. Bailey.
