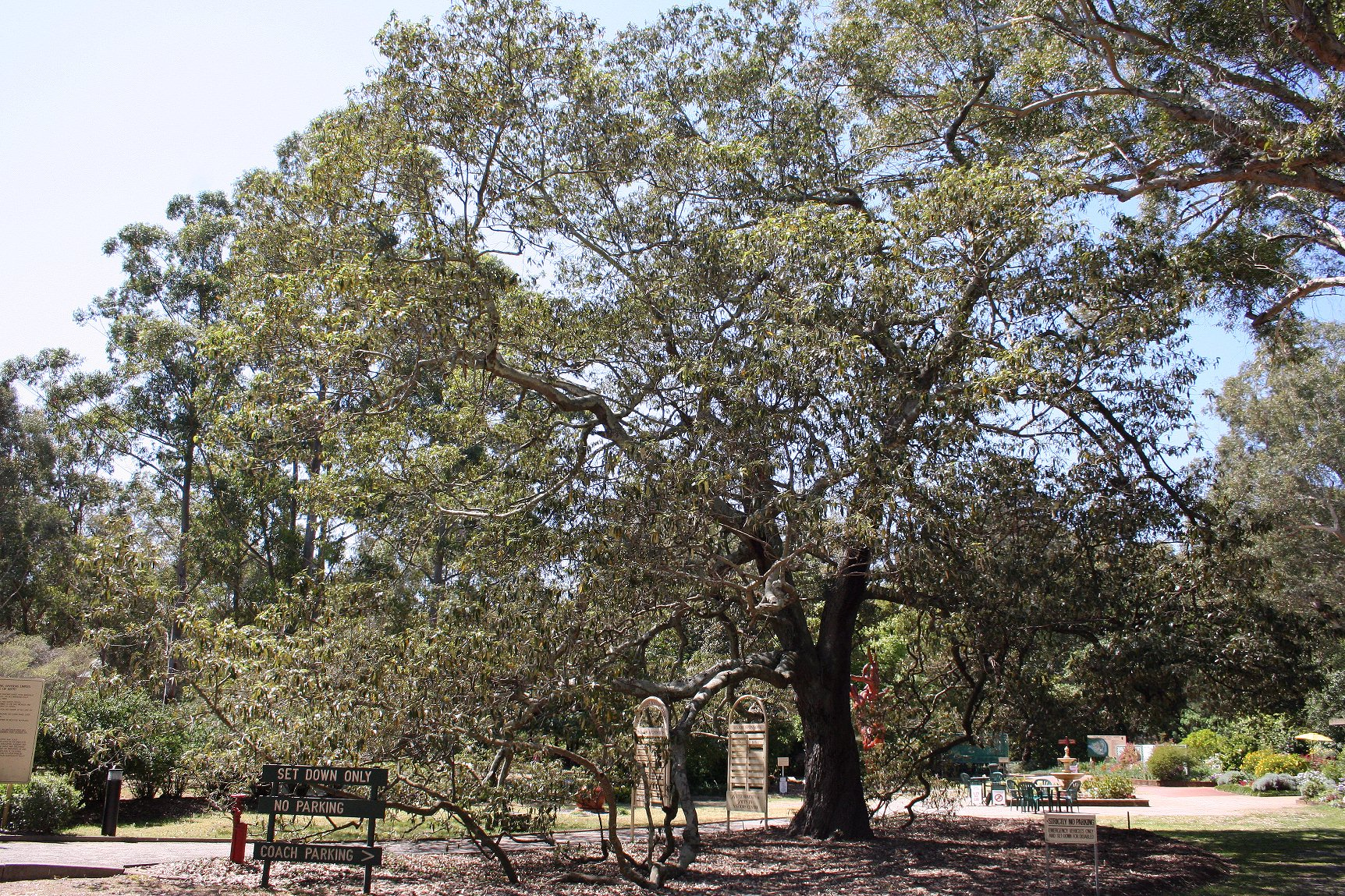

Conservation status
- Least Concern (IUCN 3.1)

Scientific classification
- Kingdom: Plantae
- Clade: Tracheophytes
- Clade: Angiosperms
- Clade: Eudicots
- Clade: Rosids
- Order: Rosales
- Family: Rhamnaceae
- Genus: Alphitonia
- Species: A. excelsa

Binomial name
- Alphitonia excelsa (Fenzl) Benth.

Synonyms
- Alphitonia excelsa var. acutifolia Braid; Ceanothus excelsa (Fenzl) Steud.; Colubrina excelsa Fenzl

= Alphitonia excelsa =

Species of tree

Alphitonia excelsa, commonly known as the red ash or soap tree, is a species of tree in the family Rhamnaceae. It is native to New Guinea and Australia, where it is found in New South Wales, Queensland, the Northern Territory, and the northeastern tip of Western Australia. It is used in bush regeneration as a pioneer species and for amenity planting.

== Taxonomy and naming ==
Alphitonia excelsa was first described by Eduard Fenzl and reclassified by George Bentham. One of 20 species of the genus Alphitonia in Australia and the Pacific Islands, its specific epithet is derived from the Latin excelsus meaning 'tall'. Other common names include red almond, silver leaf, leatherjacket, white leaf, white myrtle, sarsaparilla tree, and coopers wood.

== Description ==
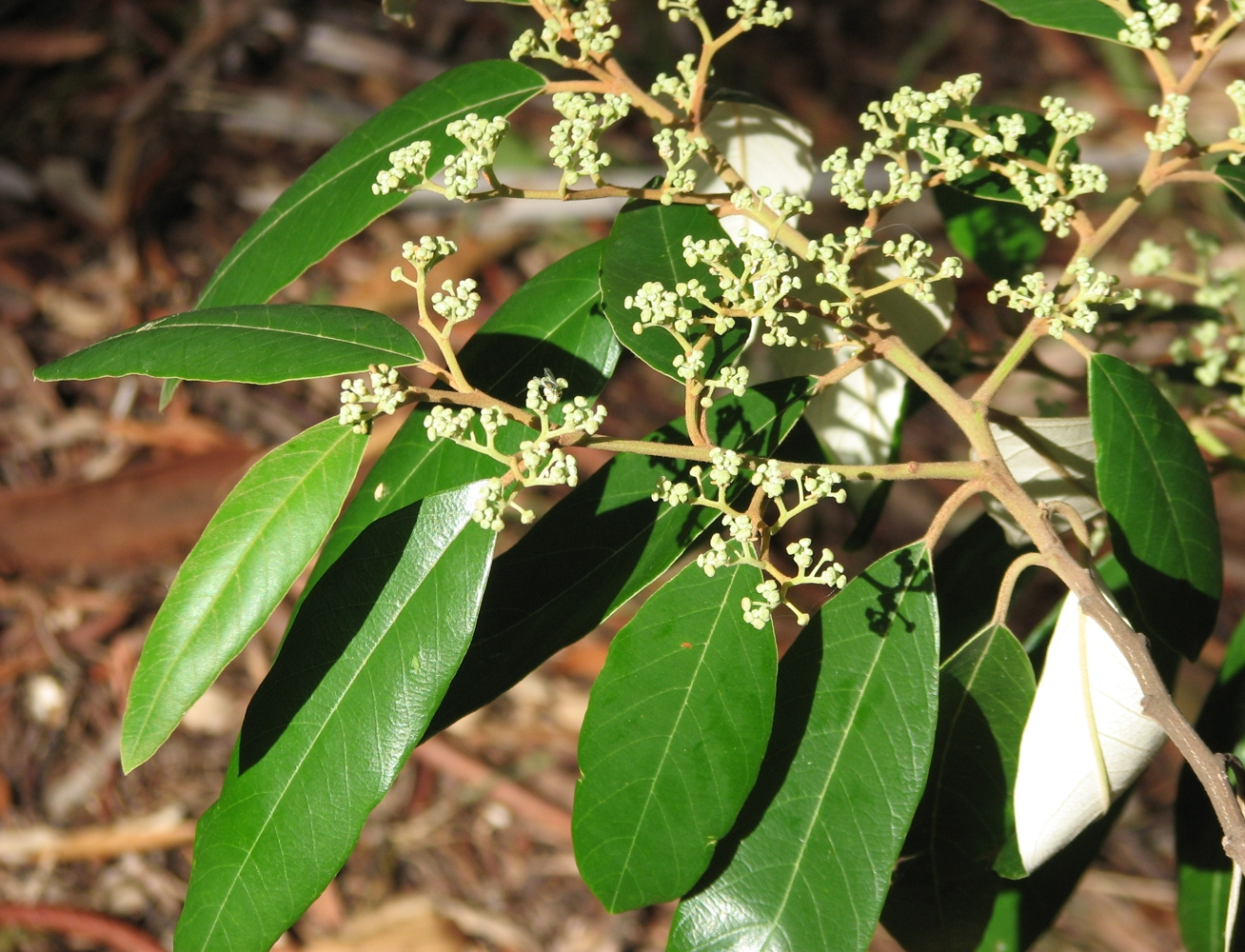
Leaves and flower buds

This tree reaches a height of 7–25 metres (23–82 ft), by 5–10 metres (16–33 ft) across. The red ash has a spreading shade-producing habit when a larger tree with an overall greyish green appearance. The alternate leaves measure 5–14 cm (2–5.5 in) in length and 2–5 cm (1–2 in) wide and are dark glossy green above and silvery with fine hairs underneath, making an attractive contrast on windy days. The trunk and larger branches bear fissured grey bark, while smaller branches have smoother grey or white bark. It bears small greenish white flowers in late autumn and early winter, followed by globular dark fruit around 1.5 cm (0.6 in) in diameter, which contain two seeds. When young shoots are bruised, they give off a typical odour of sarsaparilla. The flowers are fragrant in the evening.

== Distribution and habitat ==
It grows in eucalypt forests, eucalypt and acacia savannas, gallery forests and rainforests of NSW from Mount Gulaga (previously known as Mount Dromedary) northwards along the coast and inland to the Pilliga scrub, through Queensland and the Northern Territory and into the northeast of Western Australia. Inland forms can be stunted in appearance. It prefers sandy soils.

== Ecology ==
It serves as a food plant for the caterpillars of the moonlight jewel (Hypochrysops delicia), and the caterpillars of the small green-banded blue (Psychonotis caelius taygetus).

== Uses ==
Trees are quick growing in cultivation. This is an Australian ornamental tree, with some specimens of high visual appeal. It may be used in amenity planting as a street tree providing shelter. It has also been used in boat-building and cabinet making, its tough timber a light red or brown in colour. It can be a fodder plant for sheep and cattle, and is a useful pioneer species in bush regeneration. Indigenous Australians used the leaves as a soap due to the plant's high saponin content.
