= Aenetus splendens =

Scientific classification
- Kingdom: Animalia
- Phylum: Arthropoda
- Clade: Pancrustacea
- Class: Insecta
- Order: Lepidoptera
- Family: Hepialidae
- Genus: Aenetus
- Species: A. splendens

Binomial name
- Aenetus splendens (Scott, 1864)

Synonyms
- Charagia splendens Scott, 1864; Charagia acaciae Pfitzner in Pfitzner, & Gaede, 1933

Species of moth

Aenetus splendens is a moth of the family Hepialidae. It is known from New South Wales and Queensland.

The larvae bore in the stems of saplings of various plants, including Syzygium smithii, Callistemon, Eucalyptus, Callicoma serratifolia, Trema aspera, Casuarina, Dodonaea, Lantana camara, Pandorea pandorana and Rubus.
