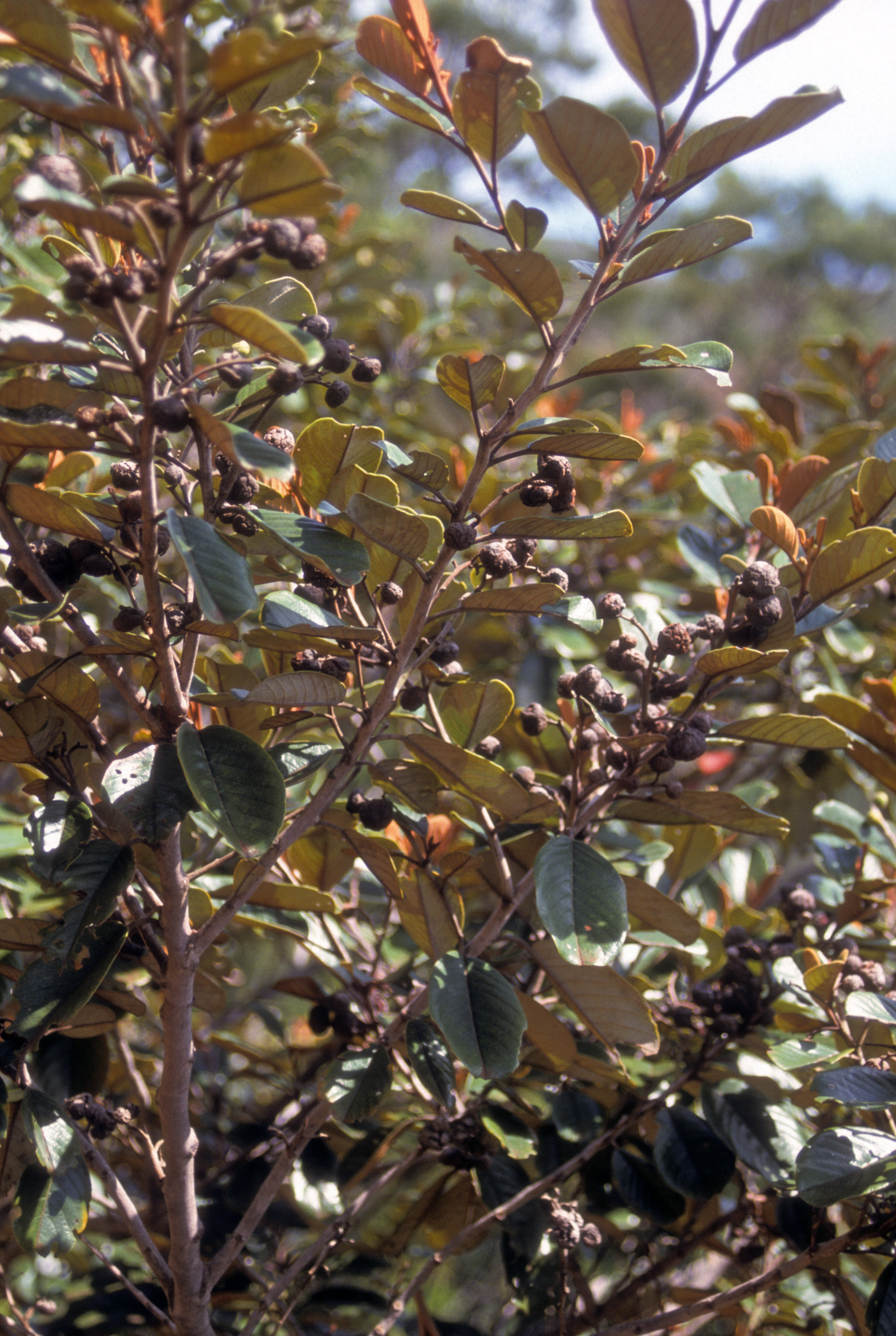
- Alphitonia neocaledonica bearing fruit

Scientific classification
- Kingdom: Plantae
- Clade: Tracheophytes
- Clade: Angiosperms
- Clade: Eudicots
- Clade: Rosids
- Order: Rosales
- Family: Rhamnaceae
- Genus: Alphitonia; Reissek ex Endl. (1840)

Species
- About 15, see text

= Alphitonia =

Genus of flowering plants

Alphitonia is a genus of arborescent flowering plants comprising about 15 species, constituting part of the buckthorn family (Rhamnaceae). They occur in tropical regions of Southeast Asia, Oceania and Polynesia. These are large trees or shrubs. In Australia, they are often called "ash trees" or "sarsaparilla trees". This is rather misleading however; among the flowering plants, Alphitonia is not closely related to the true ash trees (Fraxinus of the asterids), and barely at all to the monocot sarsaparilla vines (Smilax).

The name is derived from Greek álphiton (ἄλφιτον, "barley-meal"), from the mealy quality of their fruits' mesocarps. Another interpretation is that "baked barley meal" alludes to the mealy red covering around the hard cells in the fruit.

The lanceolate coriaceous leaves are alternate, about 12 cm long. The margins are smooth. Venation is pinnate. They have white to rusty complex hairs on the under surface. The petiole is less than a quarter the length of a blade. Stipules are present.

The small flowers form terminal or axillary clusters of small creamy blossoms during spring. The flowers are bisexual. Hypanthium is present. The flowers show 5 sepals, 5 petals and 5 stamens. The ovary is inferior. The fruits are ovoid, blackish non-fleshy capsules, with one seed per locule.

Alphitonia species are used as food plants by the larva the hepialid moth Aenetus mirabilis, which feed only on these trees. They burrow horizontally into the trunk, then vertically down.

== Species ==
15 species are accepted.

- Alphitonia carolinensis Hosok. – Caroline Islands
- Alphitonia excelsa (Fenzl) Reissek ex Benth. – soap tree, red ash - Australia
- Alphitonia ferruginea Merr. & L.M.Perry – New Guinea
- Alphitonia franguloides A.Gray – Fiji and Tonga
- Alphitonia incana (Roxb.) Teijsm. & Binn. ex Kurz – Sulawesi, Maluku, New Guinea, and Solomon Islands
- Alphitonia macrocarpa Mansf. – New Guinea and Bismarck Archipelago
- Alphitonia marquesensis F.Br. – makee – Marquesas Islands
- Alphitonia neocaledonica (Schltr.) Guillaumin – New Caledonia
- Alphitonia oblata A.R.Bean – Queensland
- Alphitonia petriei Braid & C.T.White – pink ash, white ash – Australia
- Alphitonia philippinensis Braid – Vietnam, Cambodia, Hainan, Philippines, and Borneo
- Alphitonia pomaderroides (Fenzl) A.R.Bean – northeastern Northern Territory and northern Queensland
- Alphitonia ponderosa Hillebr. – kauila – Hawaiʻi
- Alphitonia whitei Braid – red ash – Australia
- Alphitonia zizyphoides (Biehler) A.Gray – toi – Cook Islands, Fiji, Niue, Samoa, Society Islands, Tonga, Vanuatu, and Wallis & Futuna
