= Marlock =

Growth habit of select eucalyptus species

A marlock or moort is a shrubby or small-tree form of Eucalyptus found in Western Australia. Unlike the mallee, it is single-stemmed and lacks a lignotuber. It has a dense canopy of leaves which often extends to near ground level.

Marlock species include:

- Bald Island marlock (Eucalyptus conferruminata or Eucalyptus lehmannii)
- black marlock, black-barked marlock (Eucalyptus redunca)
- Comet Vale marlock (Eucalyptus comitae-vallis)
- flowering marlock, long-flowered marlock, long-leaved marlock (Eucalyptus macrandra)
- forrest's marlock (Eucalyptus forrestiana)
- limestone marlock (Eucalyptus decipiens)
- Quoin Head marlock (Eucalyptus mcquoidii)

Moorts are a form of marlock with smooth, grey bark including the following species:

- moort or round-leaved moort (Eucalyptus platypus)
- red-flowered moort (Eucalyptus nutans)
- Stoate's moort (Eucalyptus stoatei)
