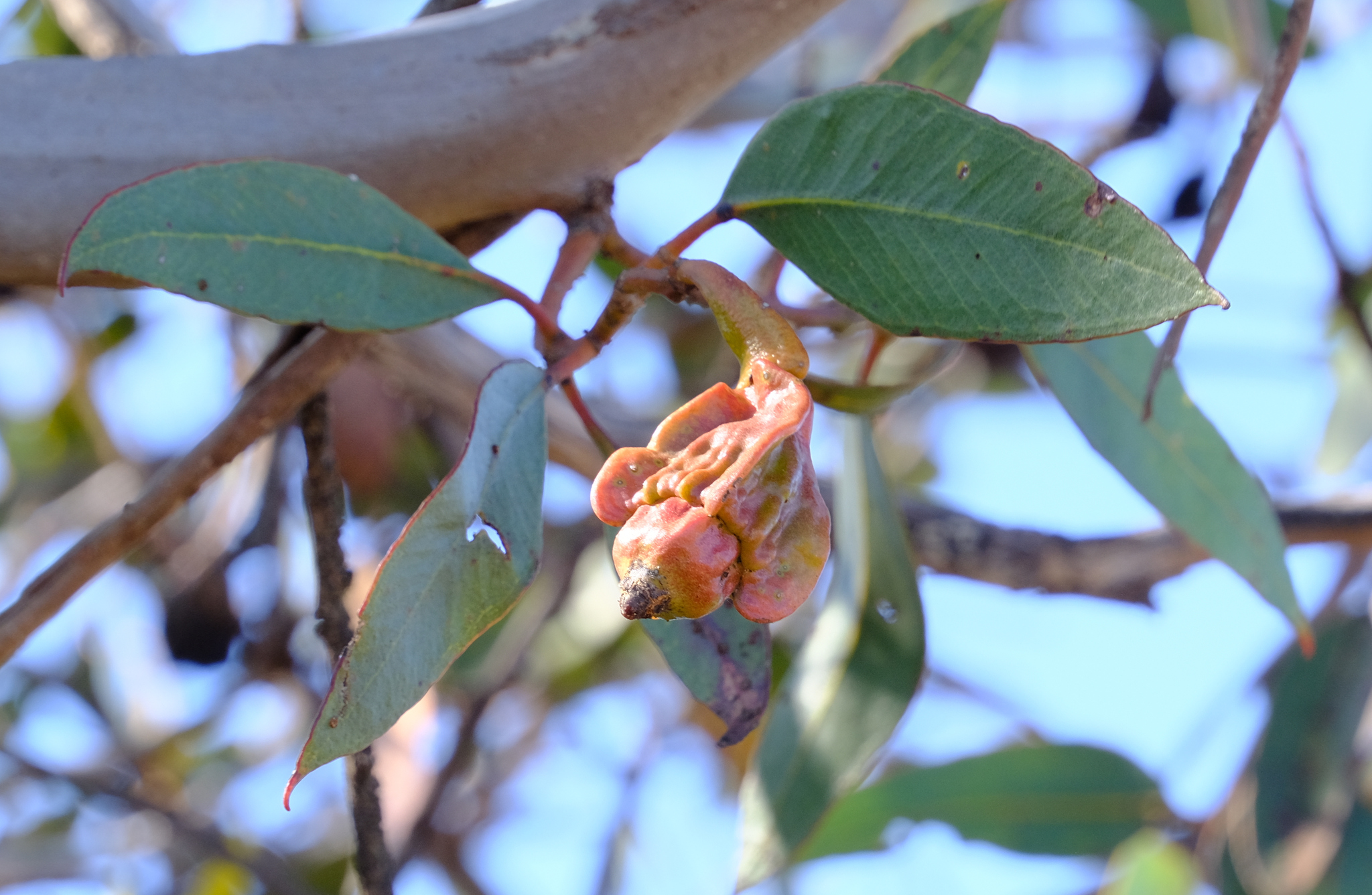

Scientific classification
- Kingdom: Plantae
- Clade: Tracheophytes
- Clade: Angiosperms
- Clade: Eudicots
- Clade: Rosids
- Order: Myrtales
- Family: Myrtaceae
- Genus: Eucalyptus
- Species: E. × stoataptera

Binomial name
- Eucalyptus × stoataptera E.M.Benn.

= Eucalyptus × stoataptera =

Species of eucalyptus

Eucalyptus × stoataptera is a hybrid species of small tree that is endemic to a small area on the south coast of Western Australia. It has a dense crown, smooth bark on the trunk and branches, glossy, oblong leaves, single flower buds in leaf axils, lemon-orange flowers, and fruit that are square in cross-section. It is a natural hybrid between Eucalyptus stoatei and E. tetraptera.

== Description ==
Eucalyptus × stoataptera grows as a tree that typically grows to a height 4 m (13 ft). It has smooth dark grey and light grey bark on the trunk and branches. Adult leaves are arranged alternately, the same shade of glossy green on both sides, oblong with a long-pointed tip, 90–110 mm (3.5–4.3 in) long and 30–35 mm (1.2–1.4 in) wide and petiolate. The flower buds are arranged singly in leaf axils on a downturned peduncle 30–35 mm (1.2–1.4 in) long becoming flattened near the floral cup, the individual buds pendent on a very short pedicel. Mature buds are red, square in cross-section with a wing on each corner, 42–48 mm (1.7–1.9 in) long and 24–28 mm (0.94–1.10 in) wide with a conical operculum. The fruit is a pendulous, woody, red capsule 36–58 mm (1.4–2.3 in) long and 25–32 mm (0.98–1.26 in) wide with a wing on each corner and up to five small ribs between each pair of wings.

== Taxonomy and naming ==
Eucalyptus × stoataptera was first formally described in 1995 by Eleanor Marion Bennett in the journal Nuytsia from specimens she collected between Ravensthorpe and Hopetoun in 1991. The specific epithet is a combination of the names of its parents, E. stoatei and E. tetraptera.

== Distribution and habitat ==
This eucalypt grows in low to medium mallee shrubland with the parent species and E. kessellii in the Esperance Plains biogeographic region.
