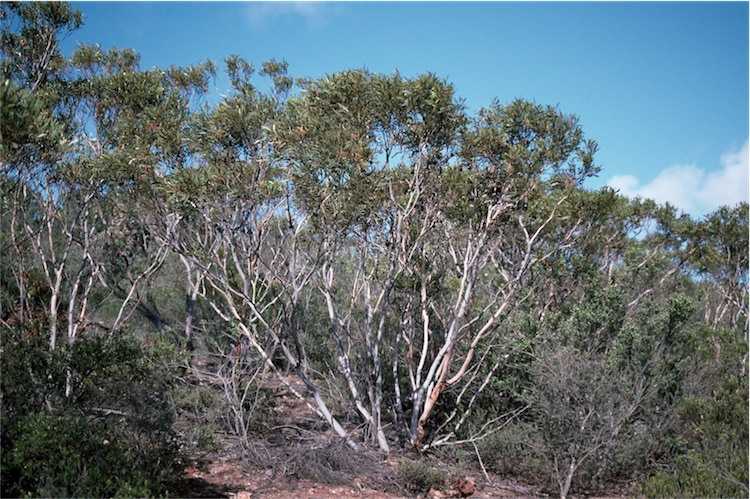
- Eucalyptus lehmanni near Ravensthorpe

Scientific classification
- Kingdom: Plantae
- Clade: Embryophytes
- Clade: Tracheophytes
- Clade: Spermatophytes
- Clade: Angiosperms
- Clade: Eudicots
- Clade: Rosids
- Order: Myrtales
- Family: Myrtaceae
- Genus: Eucalyptus
- Species: E. lehmannii

Binomial name
- Eucalyptus lehmannii (Schauer) Benth.

= Eucalyptus lehmannii =

Bushy yate

Species of eucalyptus

Eucalyptus lehmannii, commonly known as bushy yate, is a eucalypt in the myrtle family Myrtaceae endemic to the south-west of Western Australia. It is a small tree with an oval, spreading form and dense foliage which sometimes reaches to the ground. It is widely cultivated in Australia and the United States because of its ornamental shape and decorative flowers, buds and fruit. There has been some confusion about its classification because of its ability to hybridise.

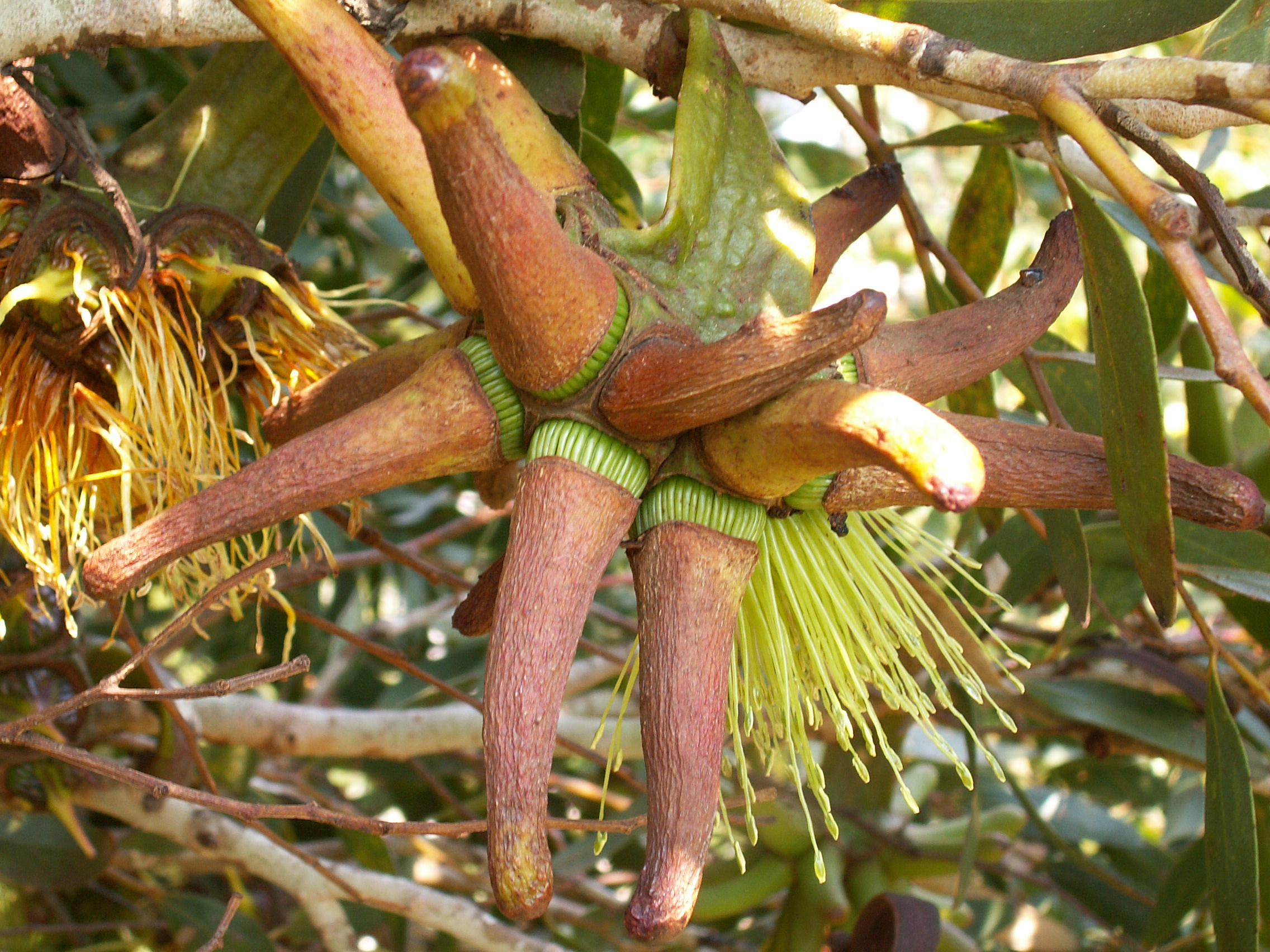
Flower buds

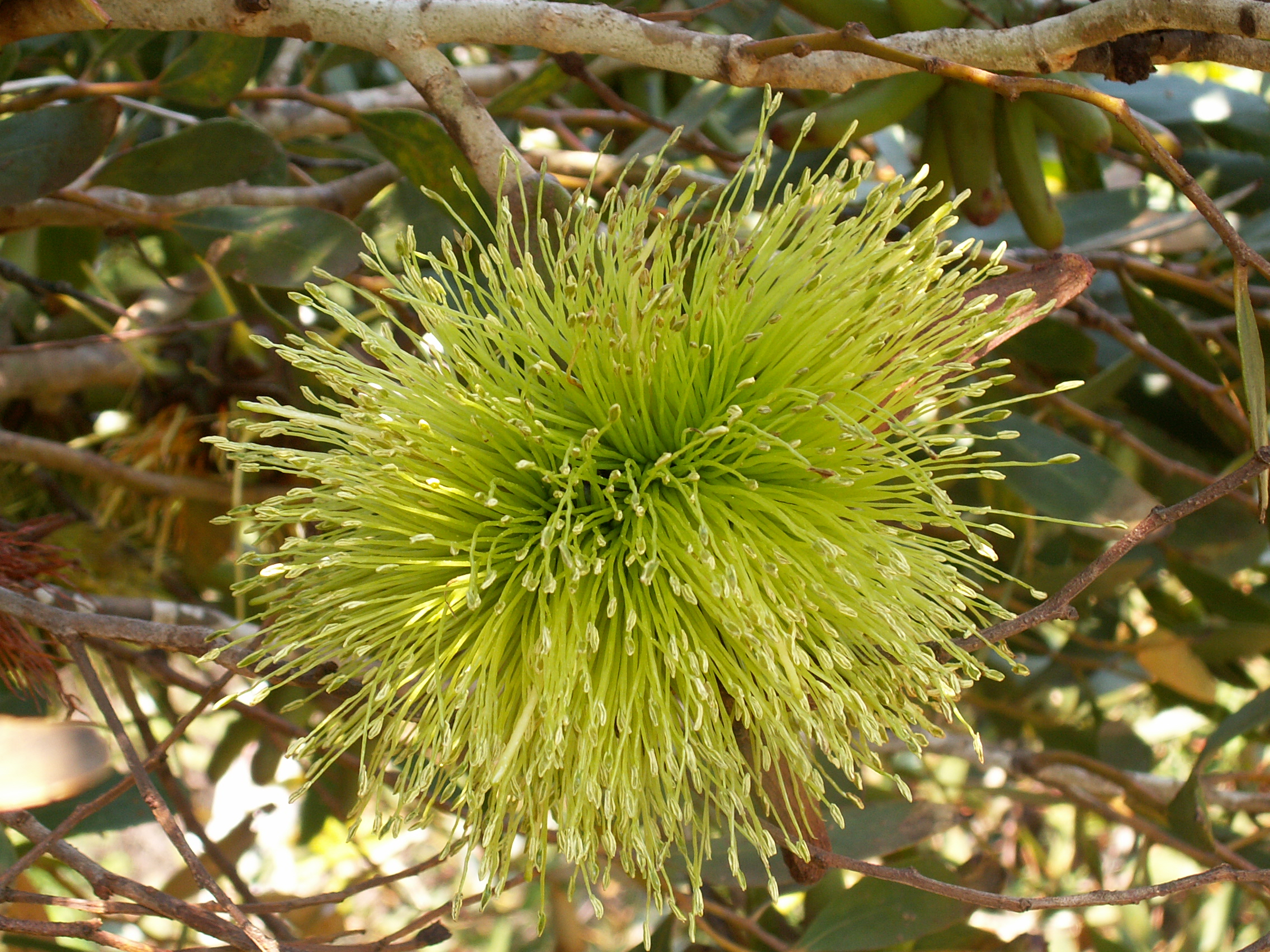
Flower

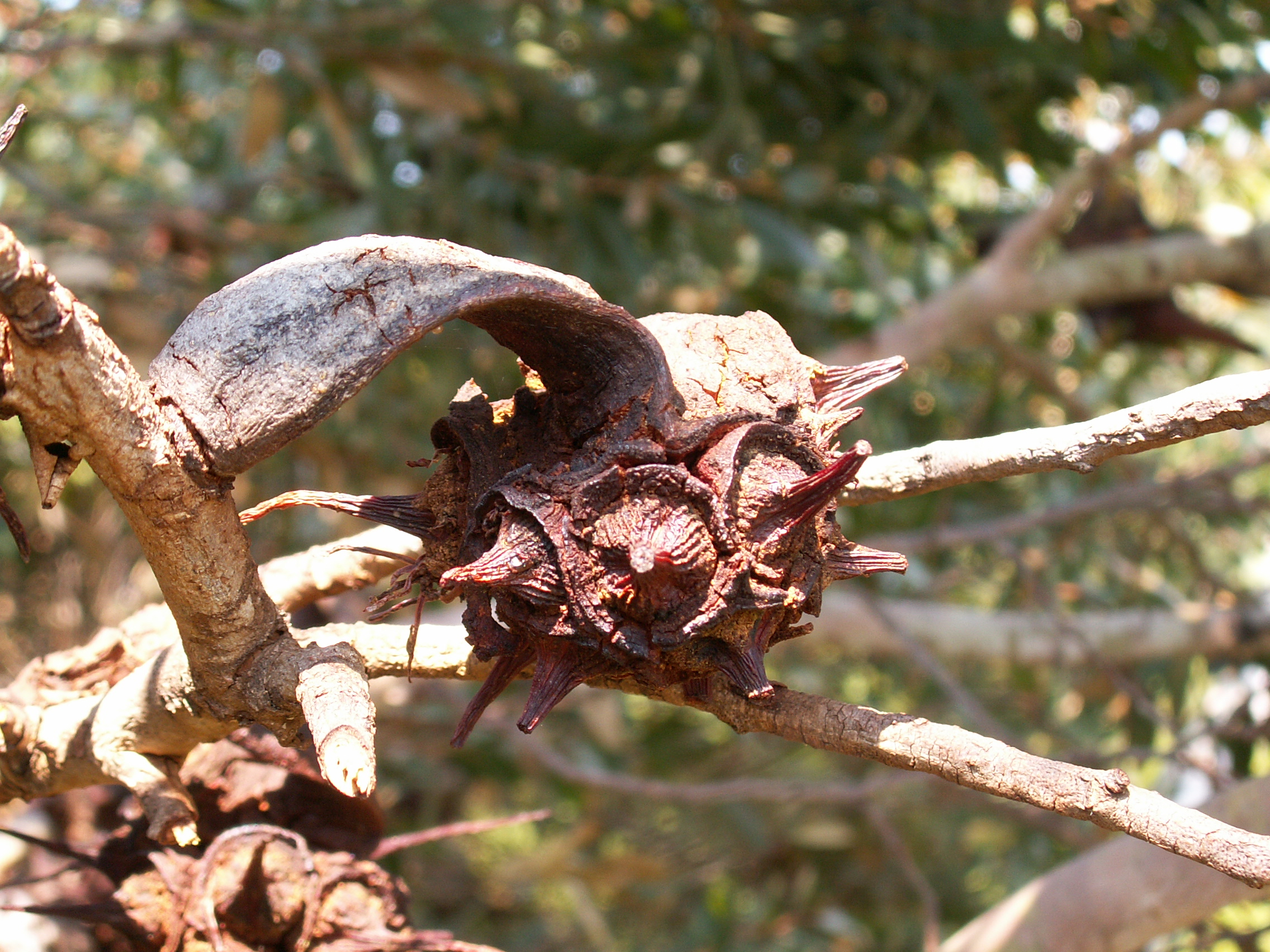
Fruit

== Description ==
Eucalyptus lehmannii is a sometimes multi-trunked mallee with smooth bark which is whitish grey to grey-brown and orange-brown and which sheds in strips. The stems of young plants are initially triangular in cross-section with leaves that are alternate, oblong to elliptical or lance-shaped, 5–8 cm long and 1–3 cm wide, glossy green on the upper surface and dull blue-green below. Older stems are smooth and round with alternate leaves. The adult leaves have a petiole 0.1–1.5 cm long and a blade elliptical to oval-shaped, about 4.5–9.5 cm long and 0.7–2.8 cm wide and both surfaces glossy light to mid-green. The oil glands in the leaves common to all eucalypts, are obscure or scattered.

The inflorescences appear in the axils of the leaves, have a flattened stalk 4–11 cm which curves downwards as the flowers open. There may be 11–19 or more buds in each inflorescence, with their bases joined. By the time the bud opens, it is about 3.3–6.5 cm long, including the cap (strictly the operculum) and 0.5–1.0 cm wide at the base of the cap. The stamens are erect and greenish-yellow.

== Taxonomy and naming ==
The species was originally in 1844 named by Schauer in Plantae Preissianae as Symphyomyrtus lehmannii. In 1867, George Bentham in Flora Australiensis placed it in the genus Eucalyptus as Eucalyptus lehmannii after Johann Georg Christian Lehmann who was Professor of Botany and Director of the Botanic Gardens in Hamburg and editor of Plantae Preissianae. There is some confusion between the species E. lehmannii and E. conferruminata - some authors place this tree in E. conferruminata. Others discriminate between these two species on characters such as operculum length - E. conferruminata is said to have a relatively short operculum.

Eucalyptus lehmannii belongs in Eucalyptus subgenus Symphyomyrtus, section Bisectae, subsection Hadrotes because of its coarsely bisected cotyledons, erect stamens and larger, thick-rimmed fruits. The subsection Hadrotes contains ten species of which eight do not have oil glands in the branchlet pith. Together these eight species form series Lehmannianae, a group that has fruit with exserted valves that have fused tips even after the seeds are lost, a feature also shared with the distantly related Eucalyptus cornuta.

Of the eight species in series Lehmannianae, four species (Eucalyptus lehmannii, E. conferruminata, E. mcquoidii and E. arborella) have the buds in each axillary cluster, fused basally.

== Distribution and habitat ==
Bushy yate is found in southern coastal and subcoastal areas from east of Albany towards Israelite Bay, including the Stirling Range. It occurs in the Esperance Plains, Jarrah Forest, Mallee and Warren biogeographic regions of Western Australia growing in sandy soils over granite or quartzite, often with gravel on rocky hills and coastal dunes.

== Ecology ==
Eucalyptus lehmannii, as well as some others of the genus including Eucalyptus cladocalyx, Eucalyptus globulus and Eucalyptus grandis have been described as invasive in southern Africa.

== Use ==
Bushy yate is a useful ornamental in Australia as a small screen, an individual specimen or as a grove. It has also been grown in other countries, including Europe and South Africa. In the United States it is described as "a useful screen or attractive courtyard tree for areas as far north as San Francisco Bay".
