= Eucalyptus minniritchi =

Scientific classification
- Kingdom: Plantae
- Clade: Embryophytes
- Clade: Tracheophytes
- Clade: Spermatophytes
- Clade: Angiosperms
- Clade: Eudicots
- Clade: Rosids
- Order: Myrtales
- Family: Myrtaceae
- Genus: Eucalyptus
- Species: E. minniritchi

Binomial name
- Eucalyptus minniritchi D.Nicolle

Species of eucalyptus

Eucalyptus minniritchi is a species of multi-stemmed, spreading mallee that is endemic to Central Australia. It has glossy, brown to grey, "minni ritchi" bark on the trunk, elliptical to egg-shaped adult leaves, flower buds mostly in groups of seven, pale creamy yellow flowers and conical to hemispherical fruit.

== Description ==
Eucalyptus minniritchi is a dense, spreading mallee that typically grows to a height of 2–3 m (6 ft 7 in – 9 ft 10 in) and forms a lignotuber. It has glossy, reddish brown, minni ritchi bark that peels in thin strips to reveal reddish or greenish new bark. Young plants and coppice regrowth have more or less round leaves that are the same dull, bluish colour on both sides, up to 35 mm (1.4 in) long and 30 mm (1.2 in) wide. Adult leaves are arranged alternately, the same dull greyish or bluish colour on both sides, elliptical to egg-shaped, 18–46 mm (0.71–1.81 in) long and 10–35 mm (0.39–1.38 in) wide on a petiole 7–18 mm (0.28–0.71 in) long. The flower buds are arranged in leaf axils in groups of seven on an unbranched peduncle 6–20 mm (0.24–0.79 in) long, the individual buds on pedicels 2.5–8 mm (0.098–0.315 in) long. Mature buds are spherical to oval, 6–10 mm (0.24–0.39 in) long and 5–8 mm (0.20–0.31 in) wide with a hemispherical operculum 5–6 mm (0.20–0.24 in) long. Flowering usually occurs after rainfall and the flowers are pale creamy yellow. The fruit is a woody, conical to hemispherical capsule 7–10 mm (0.28–0.39 in) long and 8–16 mm (0.31–0.63 in) wide with a powdery covering at first, the valves protruding. The species has characters intermediate between E. orbifolia and E. websteriana but is distinct from both.

== Taxonomy and naming ==
Eucalyptus minniritchi was first formally described in 2001 by Dean Nicolle in the journal Nuytsia from specimens collected in the Petermann Ranges. The specific epithet (minniritchi) is a reference to the bark of this eucalypt.

== Distribution and habitat ==
This mallee occurs in scattered populations on ridges in the central ranges of Australia, mainly in the Petermann and MacDonnell Ranges. It typically grows between boulders in open mallee shrubland with a Triodia understorey.

== See also ==
- List of Eucalyptus species
