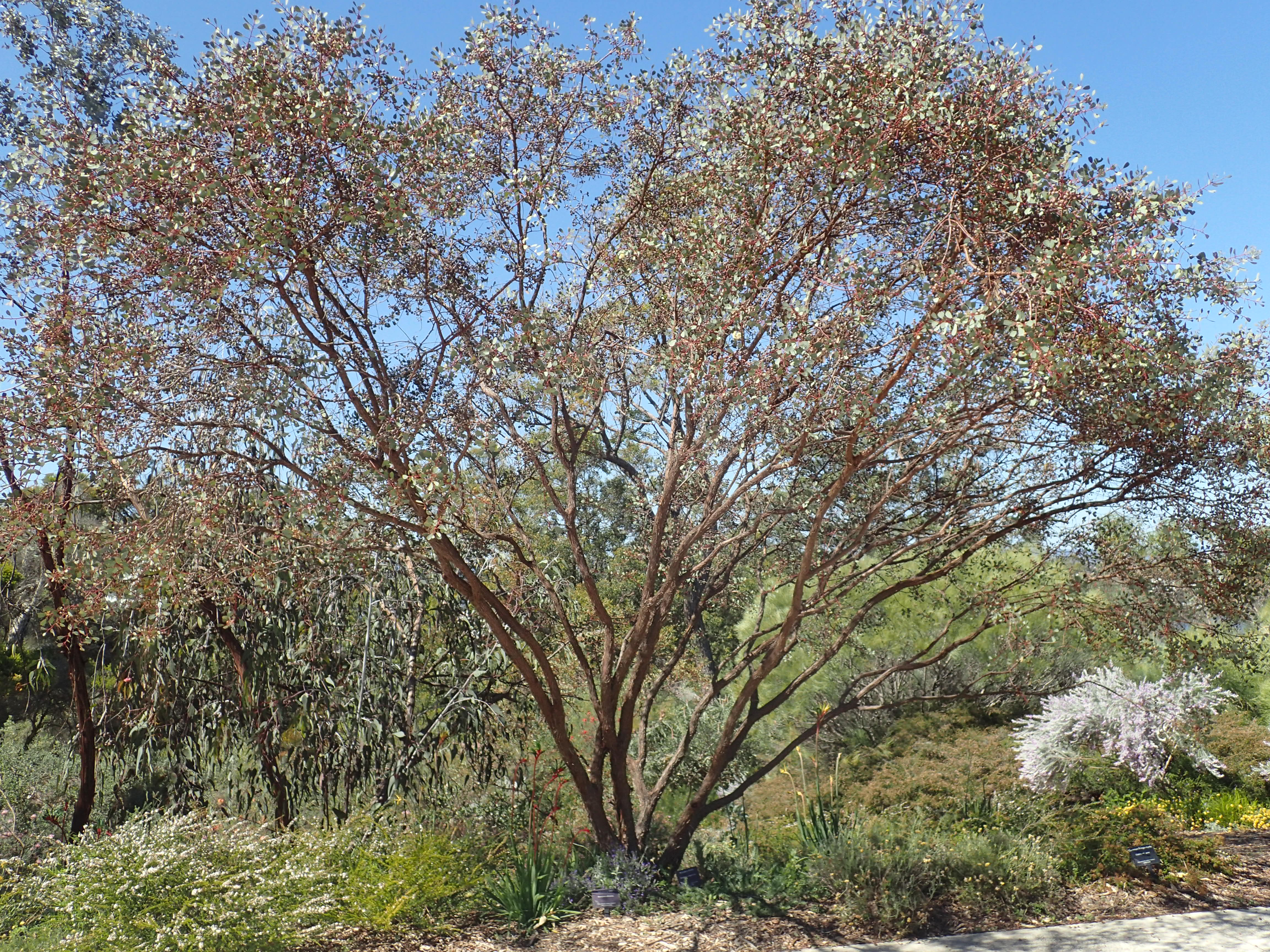
- Eucalyptus websteriana in Kings Park

Scientific classification
- Kingdom: Plantae
- Clade: Embryophytes
- Clade: Tracheophytes
- Clade: Spermatophytes
- Clade: Angiosperms
- Clade: Eudicots
- Clade: Rosids
- Order: Myrtales
- Family: Myrtaceae
- Genus: Eucalyptus
- Species: E. websteriana

Binomial name
- Eucalyptus websteriana Maiden

= Eucalyptus websteriana =

Webster's mallee

Species of eucalyptus

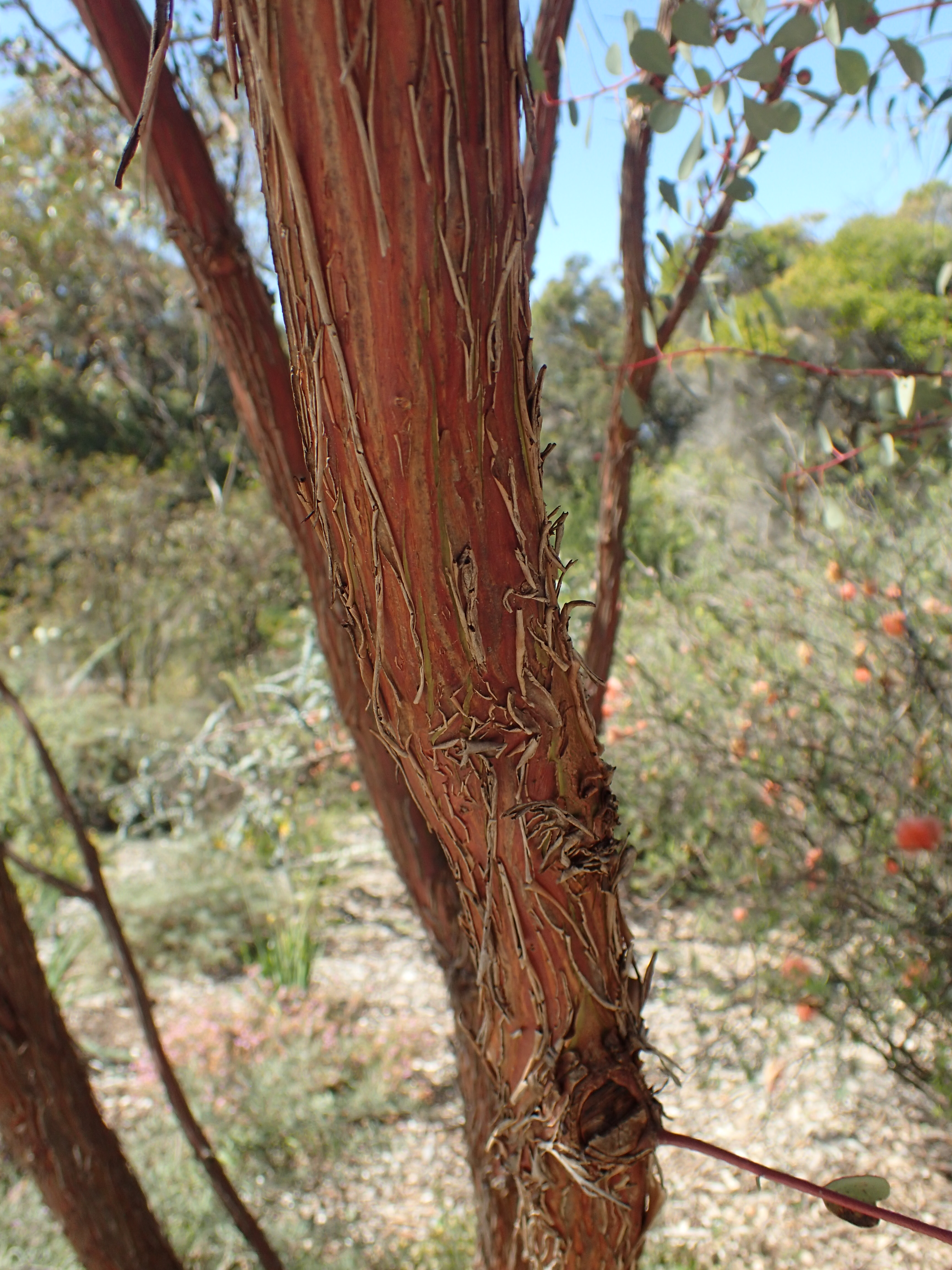
Bark

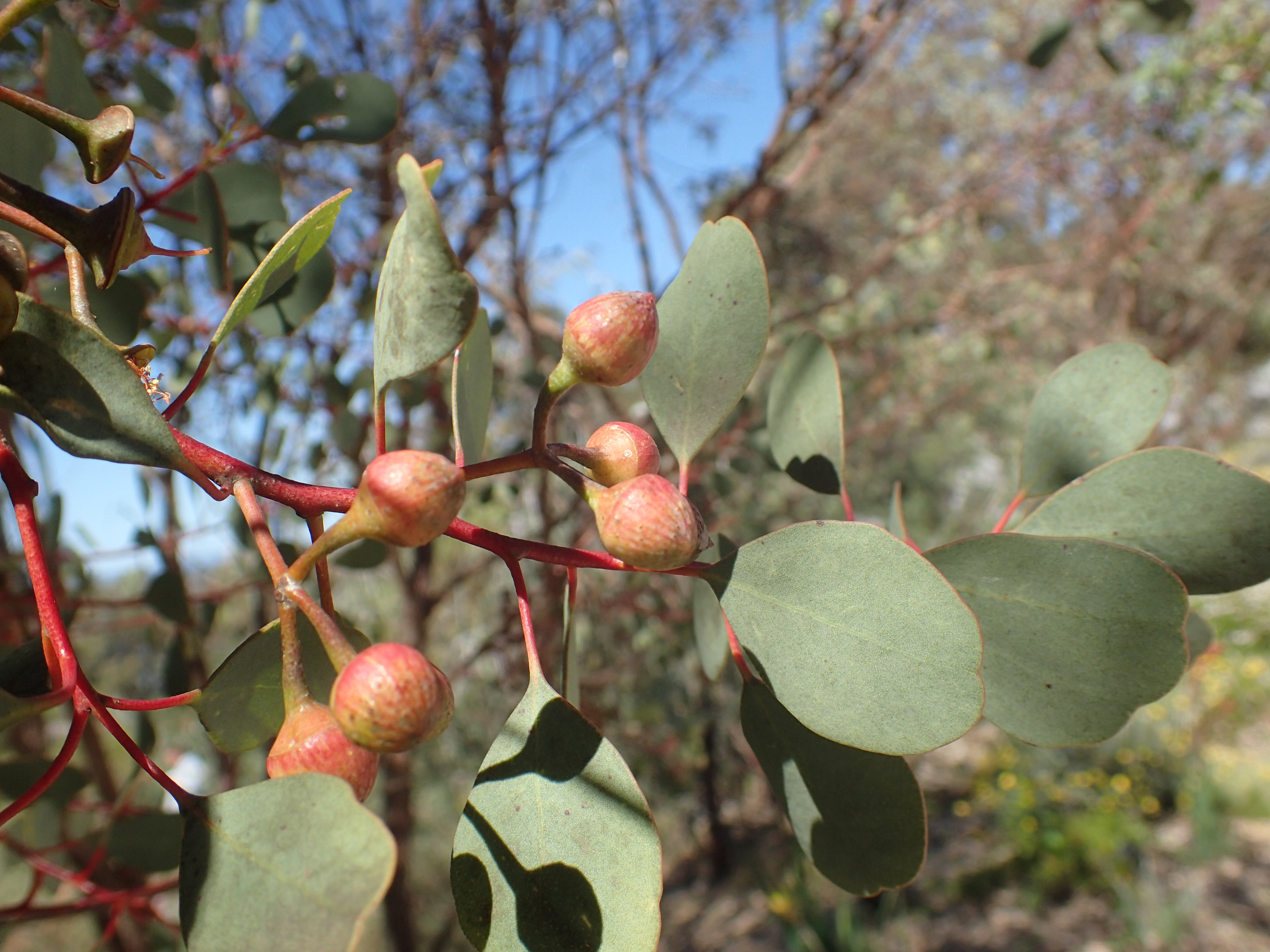
Flower buds

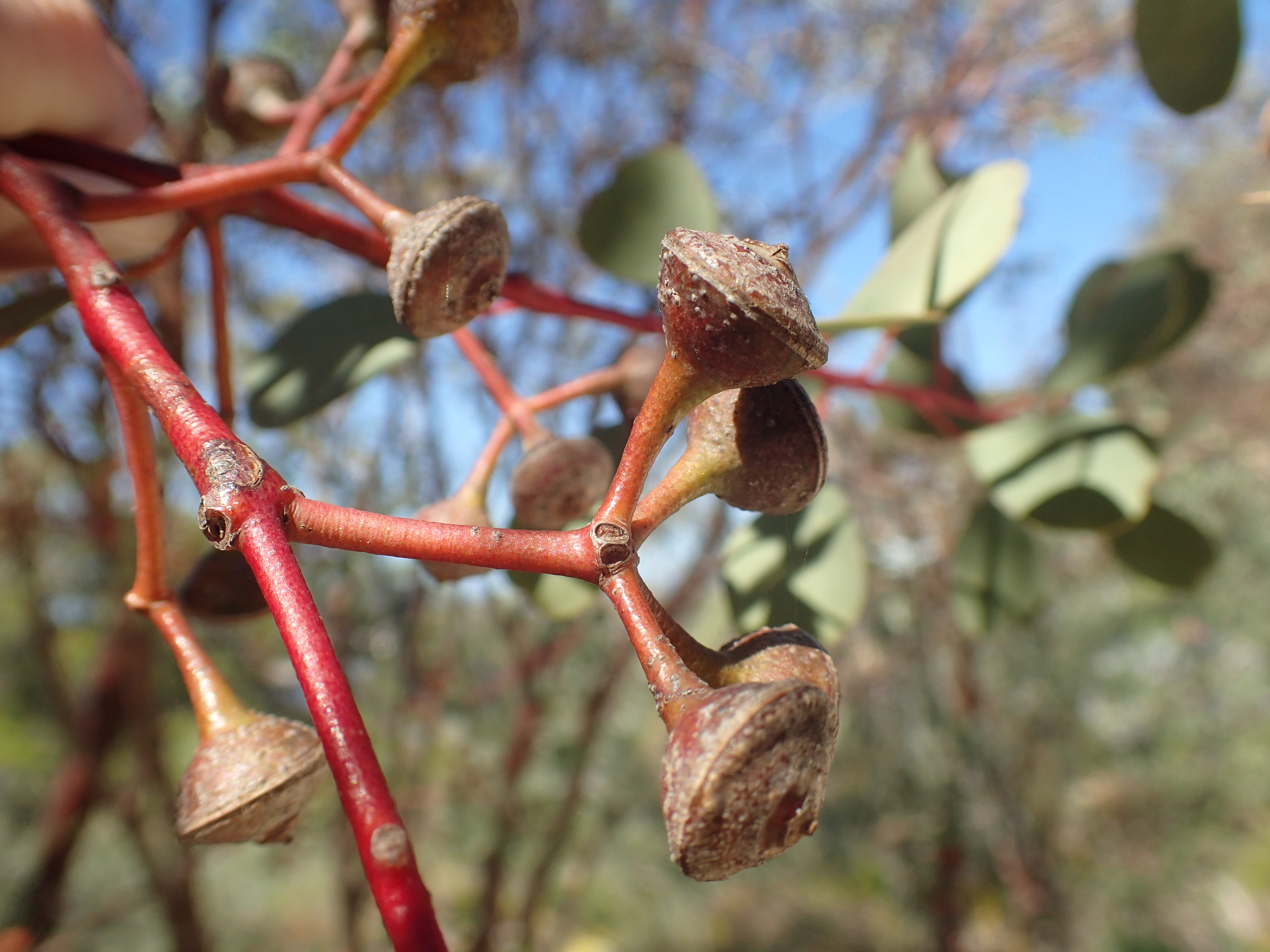
Fruit (unopened)

Eucalyptus websteriana, commonly known as Webster's mallee, heart-leaf mallee or dainty mallee, is a species of mallee that is endemic to the Goldfields-Esperance region of Western Australia. It has reddish minni ritchi bark on the trunk and branches, egg-shaped to heart-shaped adult leaves, flower buds in groups of seven, pale cream-coloured to yellow flowers and usually hemispherical fruit.

== Description ==
Eucalyptus websteriana is a mallee that typically grows to a height of 4–5 m (13–16 ft) with a spreading habit, and forms a lignotuber. It has reddish brown minni ritchi bark on the trunk and branches. The adult leaves have a distinctive heart shape and the tree has a compact crown, providing lightly dappled shade that benefits plants in the undergrowth. The leaves are the same shade of greyish green on both sides, 18–45 mm (0.71–1.77 in) long and 9–30 mm (0.35–1.18 in) wide, tapering to a petiole 5–17 mm (0.20–0.67 in) long. The flower buds are arranged in leaf axils in groups of seven on an unbranched peduncle 9–12 mm (0.35–0.47 in) long, the individual buds on pedicels 3–7 mm (0.12–0.28 in) long. Mature buds are spherical, 5–10 mm (0.20–0.39 in) long and 5–8 mm (0.20–0.31 in) wide with a rounded operculum that has a small point on the top. Flowering occurs from July to November and the flowers are pale cream-coloured to yellow. The fruit is a woody hemispherical, sometimes conical, capsule 3–6 mm (0.12–0.24 in) long and 7–12 mm (0.28–0.47 in) wide with the valves protruding prominently.

== Taxonomy and naming ==
Eucalyptus websteriana was first formally described in 1916 by Joseph Maiden in the Journal and Proceedings of the Royal Society of New South Wales from specimens collected by Leonard Clarke Webster, a pharmacist and doctor who lived in Kalgoorlie and sold botanical specimens to the British Museum of Natural History. The specific epithet honours the collector of the type specimens.

This mallee resembles E. orbifolia, with both having a similar leaf-shape, and it is also closely related to E. ewartiana and E. crucis.

== Distribution ==
This mallee is found on rocky rises in the Goldfields-Esperance region of Western Australia in an area centred around Kalgoorlie. Its range extends to the western fringe of the Great Victoria Desert to the east of Cosmo Newberry down to around Kambalda and Norseman in the south west where it grows in rocky soils.

== Conservation status ==
This eucalypt is classified as "not threatened" by the Government of Western Australia Department of Parks and Wildlife.

== See also ==
- List of Eucalyptus species
