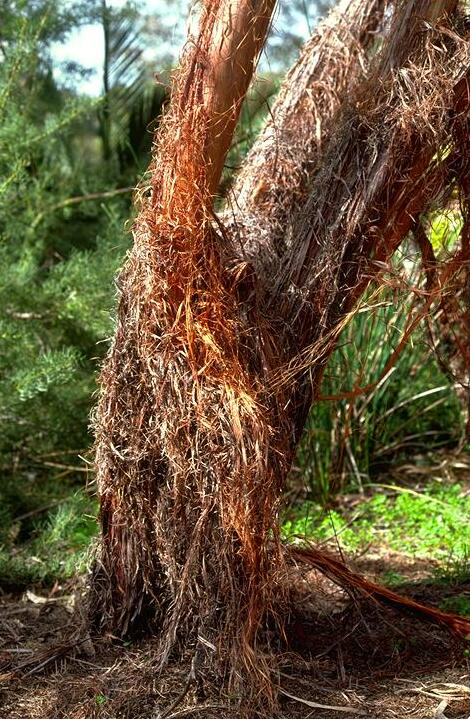
- In Kings Park

Conservation status
- Priority Three — Poorly Known Taxa (DEC)

Scientific classification
- Kingdom: Plantae
- Clade: Embryophytes
- Clade: Tracheophytes
- Clade: Spermatophytes
- Clade: Angiosperms
- Clade: Eudicots
- Clade: Rosids
- Order: Fabales
- Family: Fabaceae
- Subfamily: Caesalpinioideae
- Clade: Mimosoid clade
- Genus: Acacia
- Species: A. inophloia

Binomial name
- Acacia inophloia Maiden & Blakely
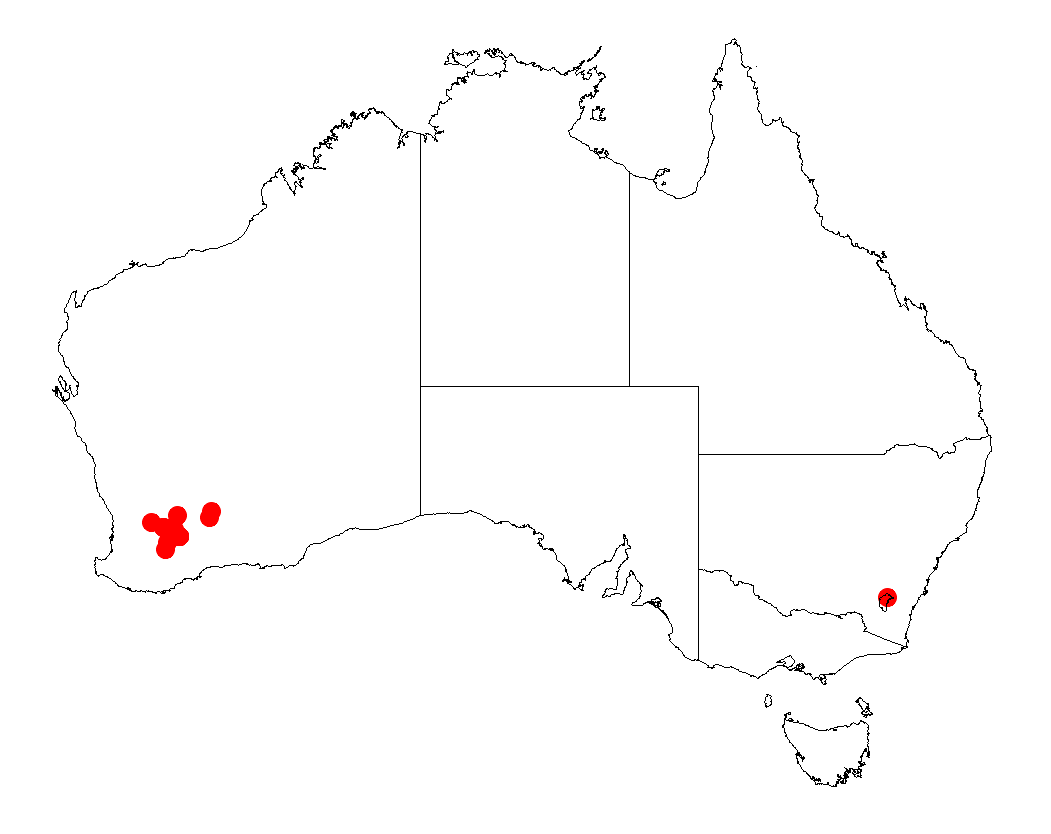
- Occurrence data from AVH

Synonyms
- Racosperma inophloia (Maiden & Blakely) Pedley

= Acacia inophloia =

Fibre-barked wattle

Species of legume

Acacia inophloia, commonly known as fibre-barked wattle, is a species of flowering plant in the family Fabaceae and is endemic to the south-west of Western Australia. It is a shrub or tree with Minni ritchi bark, thread-like phyllodes, oblong to cylindrical heads of golden yellow flowers and thinly leathery, linear pods slightly raised over the seeds.

== Description ==
Acacia inophloia is a shrub or tree that typically grows to a height of 1–3.5 m (3 ft 3 in – 11 ft 6 in) and has stringy, shaggy bark, more or less Minni Ritchi bark on the upper branches. The new shoots are bright yellow-green and more or less sticky. The branchlets are resinous and covered with silky hairs. Its phyllodes are thread-like, gently curved and terete, 60–155 mm (2.4–6.1 in) long, 0.6–0.8 mm (0.024–0.031 in) wide and greyish green with eight fine, closely parallel veins, obscured by silky hairs. The flowers are borne in an oblong to cylindrical head 8–20 mm (0.31–0.79 in) long and 4–6 mm (0.16–0.24 in) wide in axils, on a peduncle 0.7–2 mm (0.028–0.079 in) long and covered with golden hairs pressed against the surface. Each head has 50 to 76 golden yellow flowers. Flowering occurs from August to October, and the pods are linear, slightly curved, up to 80 mm (3.1 in) long and 2.5–4.0 mm (0.098–0.157 in) wide, thinly leathery and densely covered with woolly hairs. The seeds are broadly elliptic or oblong, 3.0–3.5 mm (0.12–0.14 in) long, glossy mottled brown with an aril, a thin flap of tissue.

== Taxonomy ==
Acacia inophloia was first formally described in 1928 by Joseph Maiden and William Blakely in the Journal of the Royal Society of Western Australia from specimens collected near Bendering by Charles Gardner. The specific epithet (inophloia) refers to the fibrous-stringy bark.

== Distribution ==
Fibre-barked wattle grows in gravelly, sandy and loamy granitic soils and is restricted to areas north and east of Kondinin, with a single collection near Moora in the Avon Wheatbelt, Coolgardie, Mallee and Swan Coastal Plain bioregions in the inland of south-western Western Australia.

== Conservation status ==
Acacia inophloia is listed as "Priority Three" by the Government of Western Australia Department of Parks and Wildlife, meaning that it is poorly known and known from only a few locations but is not under imminent threat.

== See also ==
- List of Acacia species
