= Acacia leeuweniana =

Leeuwen's wattle

Conservation status
- Priority One — Poorly Known Taxa (DEC)

Scientific classification
- Kingdom: Plantae
- Clade: Embryophytes
- Clade: Tracheophytes
- Clade: Spermatophytes
- Clade: Angiosperms
- Clade: Eudicots
- Clade: Rosids
- Order: Fabales
- Family: Fabaceae
- Subfamily: Caesalpinioideae
- Clade: Mimosoid clade
- Genus: Acacia
- Species: A. leeuweniana

Binomial name
- Acacia leeuweniana Maslin
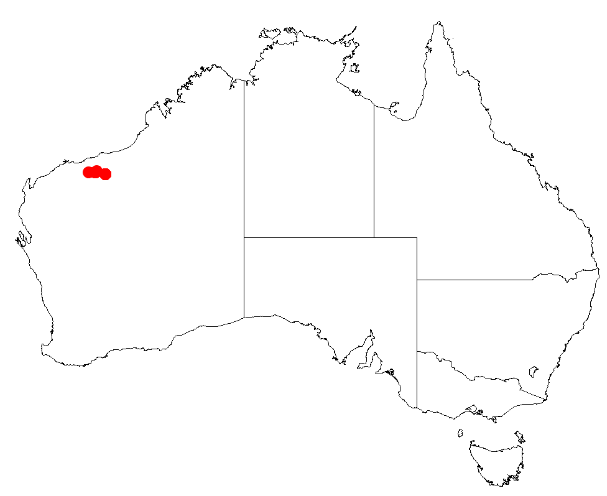
- Occurrence data from AVH

Species of legume

Acacia leeuweniana, also commonly known as Leeuwen's wattle or Spear Hill wattle, is a species of flowering plant in the family Fabaceae and is endemic to a restricted part of the north-west of Western Australia. It is a shapely, inverted con-shaped tree with linear, more or less straight, sometimes sharply pointed phyllodes, spikes of light golden yellow flowers and broadly linear, leathery to crusty or woody, resinous pods.

== Description ==
Acacia leeuweniana is a shapely, inverted cone-shaped tree that typically grows to a height of 4–8 m (13–26 ft), sometimes to 14 m (46 ft). Young plants often have a conifer-like appearance, and older plants have a short, grey stocking of Minni ritchi bark at the base. The phyllodes are linear, more or less straight and flat, 70–120 mm (2.8–4.7 in) long and 1–2 mm (0.039–0.079 in) wide, sometimes sharply pointed, green to dull grey-green or subglaucous, with many fine striations and veins close together. The flowers are light golden yellow and are borne in two to six spikes 10–20 mm (0.39–0.79 in) long in axils on peduncles 5–10 mm (0.20–0.39 in) long. Flowering has been recorded in Apri, May and October, possibly in response to rainfall.The pods are broadly linear, flat, slightly curved, 30–100 mm (1.2–3.9 in) long and 6–8 mm (0.24–0.31 in) wide, leathery to crusty or more or less woody and resinous with a visible marginal vein. The seeds are oblong to elliptic, flattened, 7–11 mm (0.28–0.43 in) long and brown with a greyish tinge.

== Taxonomy ==
Acacia leeuweniana was first formally described in 2008 by Bruce Maslin in the journal Nuytsia from specimens he collected south-west of Marble Bar in 1982. The specific epithet honours Stephen van Leeuwen, who made a large contribution to the understanding of the flora of the Pilbara.

== Distribution ==
Leeuwen's wattle is only known from two sites south-west of Marble Bar and south of Port Hedland where it grows in skeletal soil on granite outcrops in the Pilbara bioregion of north-western Western Australia.

== Conservation status ==
Acacia leeuweniana is listed as "Priority One" by the Government of Western Australia Department of Biodiversity, Conservation and Attractions, meaning that it is known from only one or a few locations that are potentially at risk.

== See also ==
- List of Acacia species
