= Acacia doreta =

Coates cushion wattle

Scientific classification
- Kingdom: Plantae
- Clade: Tracheophytes
- Clade: Angiosperms
- Clade: Eudicots
- Clade: Rosids
- Order: Fabales
- Family: Fabaceae
- Subfamily: Caesalpinioideae
- Clade: Mimosoid clade
- Genus: Acacia
- Species: A. doreta

Binomial name
- Acacia doreta Maslin

Species of legume

Acacia doreta, also known as Vollies’ minni ritchi, is a species of flowering plant in the family Fabaceae and is endemic to north-western Australia. It is a shrub or small tree with minni ritchi bark, glabrous branchlets, more or less terete phyllodes, spherical to oblong heads or spikes of light golden yellow flowers and narrowly oblong to linear pods.

== Description ==
Acacia doreta is a shrub or small tree that typically grows to a height of 1.5–5 m (4 ft 11 in – 16 ft 5 in) and has a more or less flat topped to semi rounded crown and red to reddish-brown minni ritchi bark, commonly extending to the upper branchlets. The branchlets are glabrous. Its phyllodes are more or less terete, 20–60 mm (0.79–2.36 in) long, 0.8–1.5 mm (0.031–0.059 in) in diameter with a hard but not sharply pointed tip. The flowers are light golden yellow and borne in spherical or oblong heads, or in spikes 5–22 mm (0.20–0.87 in) long on peduncles 8–22 mm (0.31–0.87 in) long. As with other arid zone acacias, flowering and fruiting of this species is probably influenced by the timing and intensity of rainfall events. Flowers of A. doreta have been collected from early April to mid-September. The pods are narrowly oblong to linear, flat, 15–50 mm (0.59–1.97 in) long, 2.5–5 mm (0.098–0.197 in) wide, thinly leathery to crusty, brown and glabrous. The seeds are oblong to elliptic, 2–4 mm (0.079–0.157 in) long, 1.5–2 mm (0.059–0.079 in) wide and dark brown to black with an aril.

== Taxonomy ==
Acacia doreta was first formally described in 2014 by Bruce Maslin in the journal Nuytsia from specimens collected in the Little Sandy Desert, 210 km (130 mi) south and 80 km (50 mi) east of Newman in 2012. The specific epithet (doreta) means 'generous' or 'freely given', "dedicated to the team of volunteers at the Western Australian Herbarium who so generously and graciously give of their time and skills to assist the institution".

== Distribution and habitat ==
This species of Acacia occurs in a variety of habitats, often on the slopes of rocky hills, in scattered locations in the eastern desert regions of Western Australia, and east to the south-central parts of the Northern Territory and the far north-west of South Australia.

== Conservation status ==
Acacia doreta is listed as "not threatened" by the Government of Western Australia Department of Biodiversity, Conservation and Attractions, and as of "least concern" under the Northern Territory Government Territory Parks and Wildlife Conservation Act.

== See also ==
- List of Acacia species
