= Acacia minniritchi =

Scientific classification
- Kingdom: Plantae
- Clade: Tracheophytes
- Clade: Angiosperms
- Clade: Eudicots
- Clade: Rosids
- Order: Fabales
- Family: Fabaceae
- Subfamily: Caesalpinioideae
- Clade: Mimosoid clade
- Genus: Acacia
- Species: A. minniritchi

Binomial name
- Acacia minniritchi I.M.Turner

Synonyms
- Acacia gracillima Tindale nom. illeg.; Racosperma gracillimum Pedley

Species of legume

Acacia minniritchi is a species of flowering plant in the family Fabaceae, and is endemic to the Kimberley region of Western Australia. It is a shrub or tree with dark red Minni Ritchi bark, linear, curved phyllodes, spikes of bright yellow flowers, and linear pods constricted between and rounded over the seeds.

== Description ==
Acacia minniritchi is a shrub or tree that typically grows to a height of up to 4 m (13 ft) and has dark red Minni Ritchi bark. Its branchlets are angular with a few soft hairs on the ridges. The phyllodes are mostly 35–65 mm (1.4–2.6 in) long, 1–2 mm (0.039–0.079 in) wide, thinly textured, not rigid and have yellowish hairs that lie flat on the surface. There are many veins, the central vein most prominent, and a gland 0.4–3 mm (0.016–0.118 in) above the pulvinus. The flowers are bright yellow and borne in spikes 20–40 mm (0.79–1.57 in) long. Flowering occurs between May and July and the pods are linear, 40–90 mm (1.6–3.5 in) long, 4–5 mm (0.16–0.20 in) wide, greenish brown, sticky, and covered with shaggy hairs, especially when young. The seeds are oblong, compressed and brown to black.

== Taxonomy ==
In 1975, Mary Tindale describe Acacia gracillima in the journal Telopea from specimens collected on Bold Bluff by William Vincent Fitzgerald in the Western Kimberley in 1905, but that name was illegitimate because it had already been given to a fossil species by de Saporta. In 2014, Ian Mark Turner changed the name to Acacia minniritchi in Annales Botanici Fennici.

== Distribution and habitat ==
Acacia minniritchi grows in grassland or on steep, rocky slopes, often amongst quartzite, from the Buccaneer Archipelago and south east to the King Leopold Range in the Central Kimberley, Dampierland and Northern Kimberley bioregions of northern Western Australia.

== See also ==
- List of Acacia species
