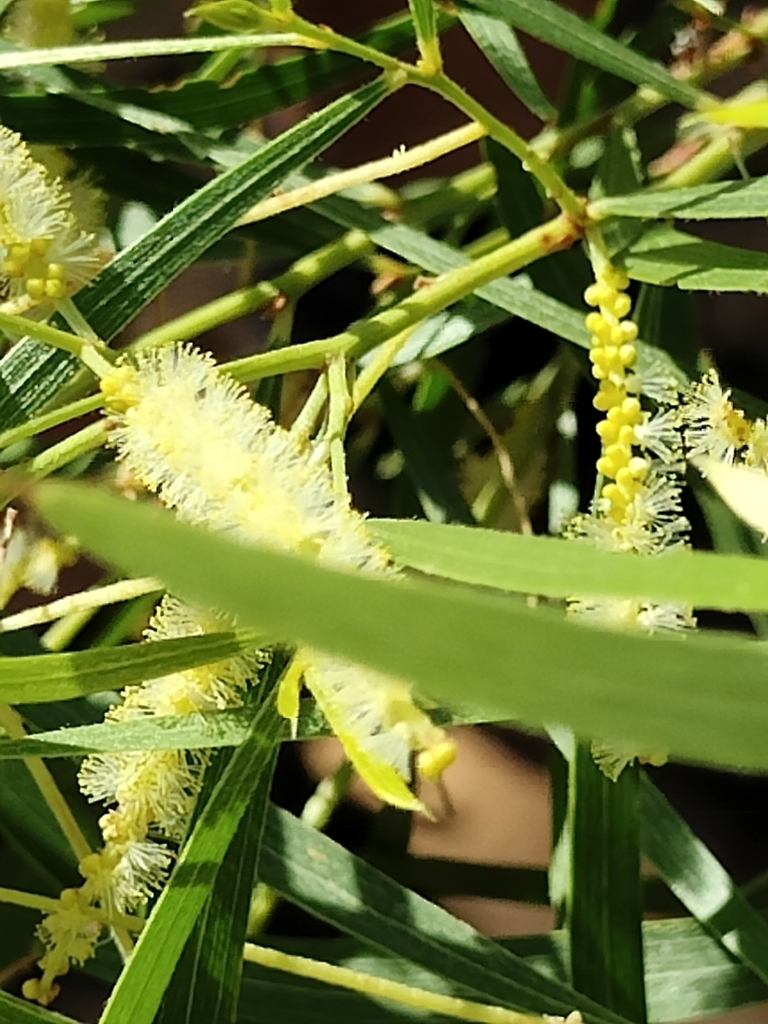

Scientific classification
- Kingdom: Plantae
- Clade: Tracheophytes
- Clade: Angiosperms
- Clade: Eudicots
- Clade: Rosids
- Order: Fabales
- Family: Fabaceae
- Subfamily: Caesalpinioideae
- Clade: Mimosoid clade
- Genus: Acacia
- Species: A. delibrata

Binomial name
- Acacia delibrata A.Cunn. ex Benth.
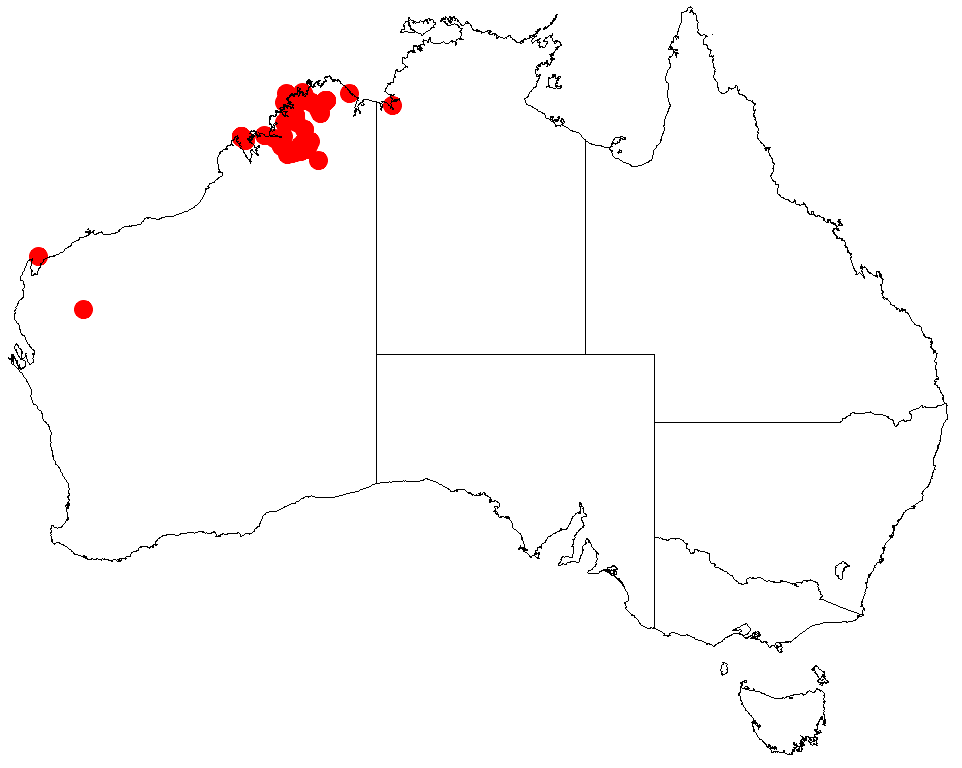
- Occurrence data from AVH

Synonyms
- Racosperma delibratum (A.Cunn. ex Benth.) Pedley

= Acacia delibrata =

Species of legume

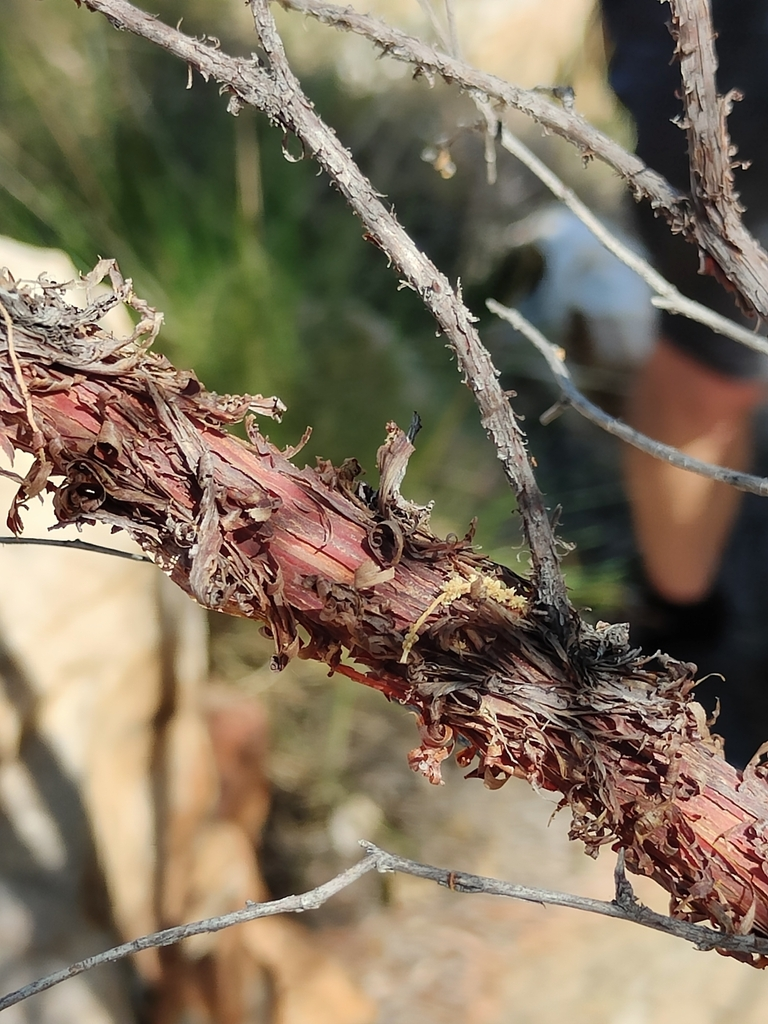
Bark in the Wunaamin Miliwundi Ranges

Acacia delibrata is a species of flowering plant in the family Fabaceae and is endemic to northern Western Australia. It is a slender shrub or tree with distinctive minni ritchi bark, very narrowly elliptic to more or less linear phyllodes, spikes of pale yellow or cream-coloured flowers and linear, crust-like pods, appearing somewhat like a string of beads.

== Description ==
Acacia delibrata is a slender shrub or tree that typically grows to a height of up to 9 m (30 ft) with minni ritchi bark up to 4.5 m (15 ft) high. Its branchlets are dark red-brown, and covered with silky hairs or glabrous. The phyllodes are very narrowly elliptic to more or less linear, 60–145 mm (2.4–5.7 in) long, 1.5–8 mm (0.059–0.315 in) wide and thin with a conspicuous mid-vein and up to three less prominent veins. The flowers are pale yellow or cream-coloured and borne in spikes 15–30 mm (0.59–1.18 in) long. Flowering has been recorded in April to June and in August and October, and the pods are linear, often twisted, and resemble a string of beads 80–140 mm (3.1–5.5 in) long and crust-like. The seeds are round, 4–5 mm (0.16–0.20 in) long and light brown to blackish.

== Taxonomy ==
Acacia delibrata was first formally described in 1842 by George Bentham in Hooker's London Journal of Botany from an unpublished description by Allan Cunningham of specimens collected near the north-west coast of Western Australia. The specific epithet (delibrata) means 'stripped of bark'.

== Distribution and habitat ==
This species of wattle grows in tropical Western Australia on the offshore islands and mainland between latitude 15°S and 17°S and longitude 123°E and 127°E. It grows in stony soil over quartzite or sandstone on plateaus on the coast or along watercourses in woodland or in pure stands in the Central Kimberley and Northern Kimberley bioregions of northern Western Australia.

== Conservation status ==
Acacia delibrata is listed as "not threatened" by the Government of Western Australia Department of Biodiversity, Conservation and Attractions.

== See also ==
- List of Acacia species
