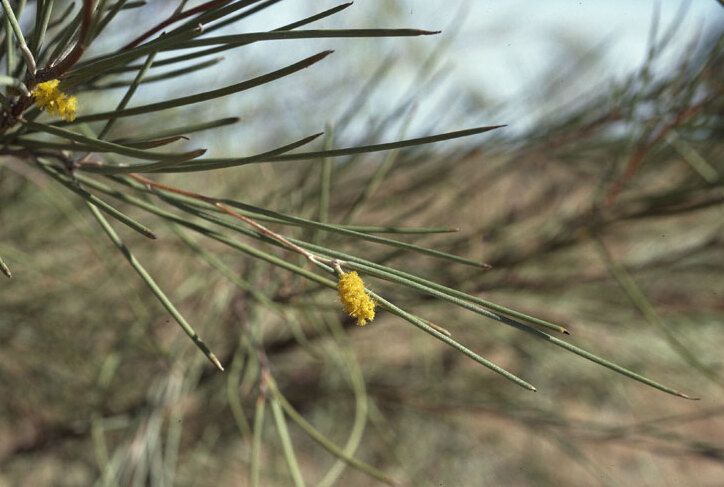

Scientific classification
- Kingdom: Plantae
- Clade: Tracheophytes
- Clade: Angiosperms
- Clade: Eudicots
- Clade: Rosids
- Order: Fabales
- Family: Fabaceae
- Subfamily: Caesalpinioideae
- Clade: Mimosoid clade
- Genus: Acacia
- Species: A. cyperophylla

Binomial name
- Acacia cyperophylla F.Muell. ex Benth.
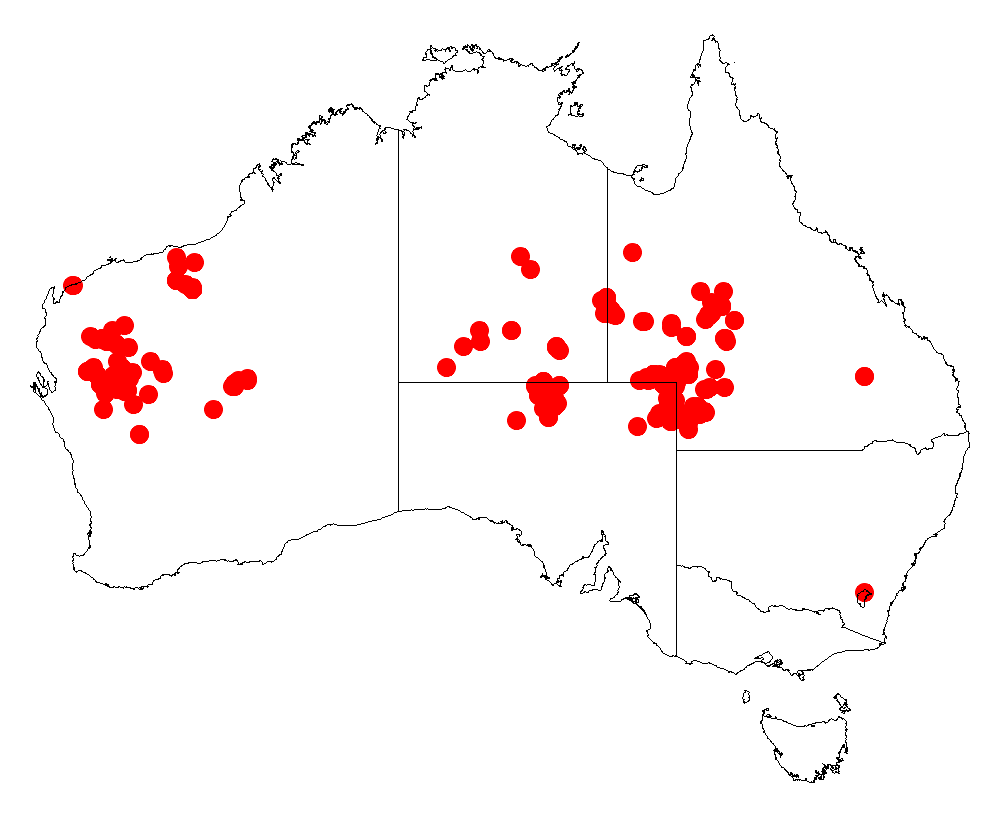
- Occurrence data from AVH

= Acacia cyperophylla =

Creekline miniritchie

Species of legume

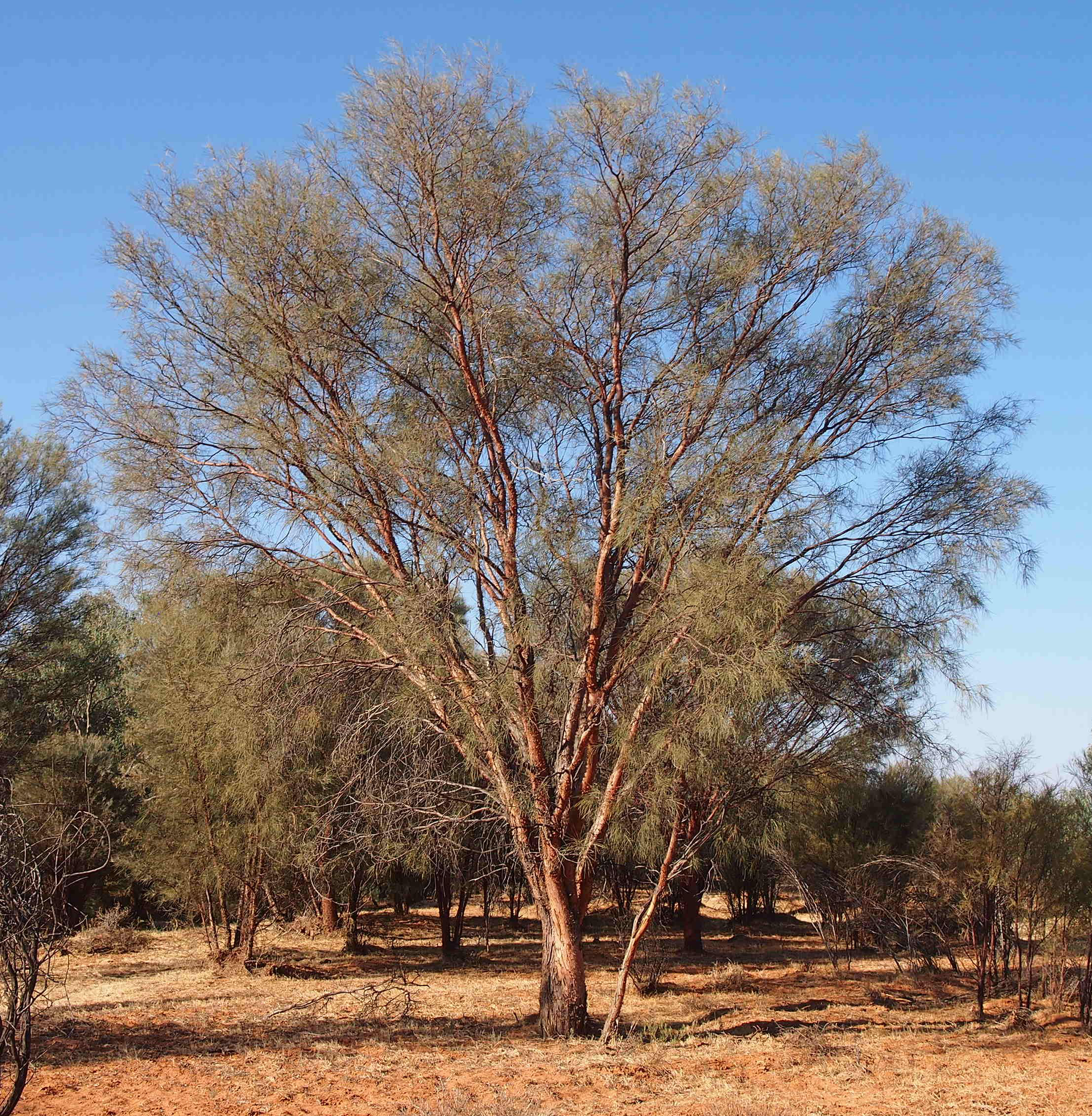
Habit

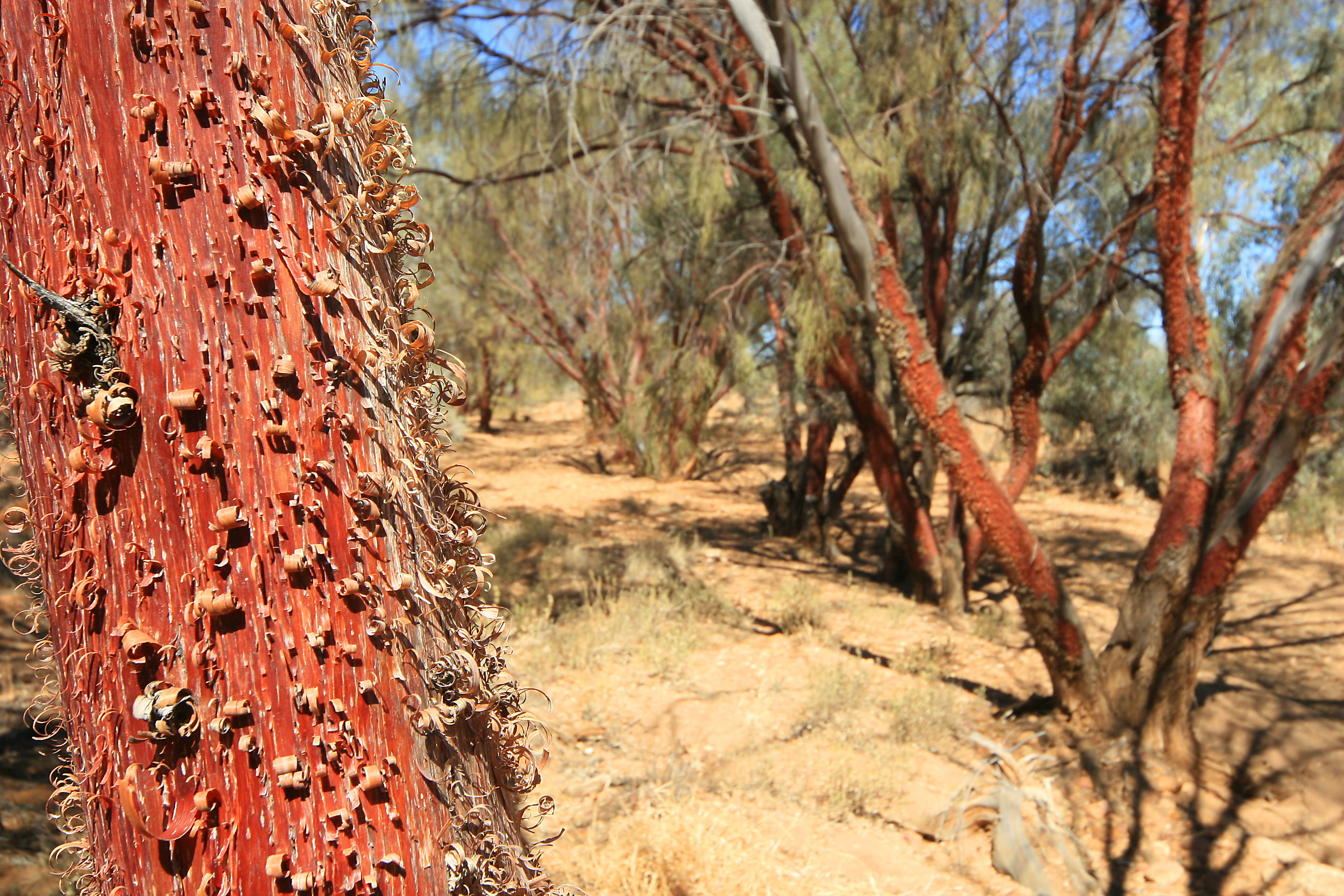
Mini ritchie bark

Acacia cyperophylla, commonly known as creekline miniritchie, red mulga, or mineritchie is a species of flowering plant in the family Fabaceae and is endemic to northern Australia. It is a shrub or usually a tree with minni ritchi bark, straight or slightly curved phyllodes with a sharp point on the end, spikes of pale yellow flowers and narrowly oblong to linear, more or less woody pods.

== Description ==
Acacia cyperophylla is a multi-stemmed shrub, or usually a tree that typically grows to a height of up to 12 m (39 ft) and has minni ritchi bark. Its phyllodes are more or less erect or pendulous, straight or slightly curved, more or less terete, 70–280 mm (2.8–11.0 in) long and usually 0.8–2 mm (0.031–0.079 in) wide with a sharp point on the end. The flowers are pale yellow and borne in spikes 10–30 mm (0.39–1.18 in) long. Flowering time depends on the variety, and the pods are narrowly oblong to linear, more or less flat, straight-sided or slightly constricted between the seeds, 40–160 mm (1.6–6.3 in) long and more or less woody.

== Taxonomy ==
Acacia cyperophylla was first formally described in 1864 by George Bentham in his Flora Australiensis from an unpublished description by Ferdinand von Mueller. The specific epithet (cyperophylla) means 'sedge-leaved'.

In 1991, Bruce Maslin described Acacia cyperophylla var. omearana in The Western Australian Naturalist, and the name and that of the autonym are accepted by the Australian Plant Census:

- Acacia cyperophylla F.Muell. ex Benth. var. cyperophylla (the autonym) has end branchlets that are not pendulous, more or less erect phyllodes, flowers from May to December, probably sporadic after good rains, and pods commonly 4–5 mm (0.16–0.20 in) wide in Western Australia and 6–11 mm (0.24–0.43 in) wide in eastern Australia.
- Acacia cyperophylla var. omearana Maslin has pendulous end branchlets and phyllodes, flowers recorded in March and October, the pods 7–9 mm (0.28–0.35 in) wide.

The varietal name (omeara) honours Denis O'Meara, who discrovered the variety around 1980.

== Distribution and habitat ==
The species' range extends across arid and semi-arid regions of from Carnarvon in Western Australia through the Northern Territory and northern South Australia to western Queensland. It is commonly found growing in drainage lines and on the banks of rivers and creeks.

Variety omeara is only known from the Pilbara bioregion.

== Conservation status ==
The variety cyperophylla is listed as "not threatened", but var. omeara is listed as "Priority One" by the Government of Western Australia Department of Biodiversity, Conservation and Attractions, meaning that it is known from only one or a few locations where it is potentially at risk.

== See also ==
- List of Acacia species
