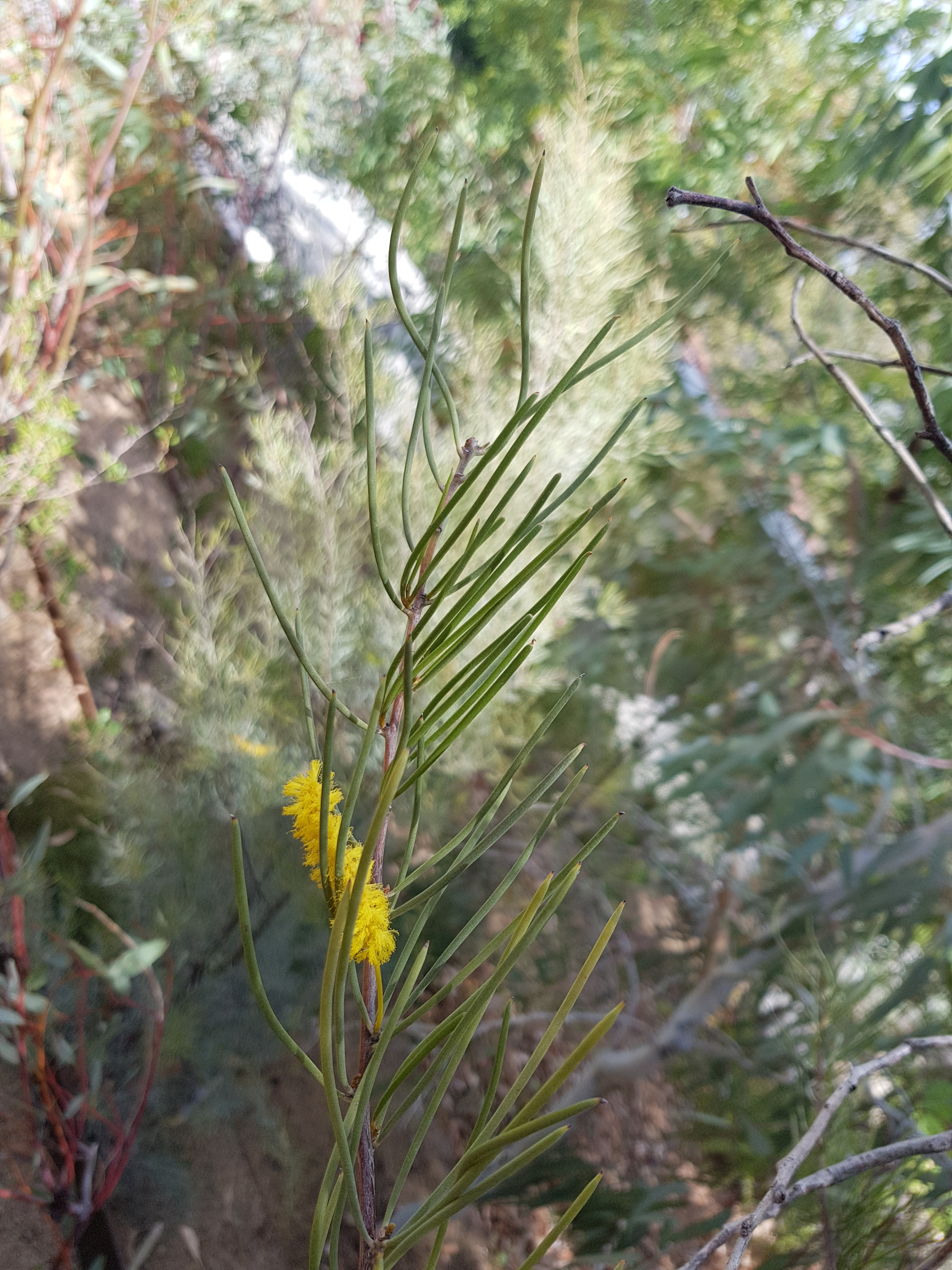

Scientific classification
- Kingdom: Plantae
- Clade: Tracheophytes
- Clade: Angiosperms
- Clade: Eudicots
- Clade: Rosids
- Order: Fabales
- Family: Fabaceae
- Subfamily: Caesalpinioideae
- Clade: Mimosoid clade
- Genus: Acacia
- Species: A. grasbyi

Binomial name
- Acacia grasbyi Maiden
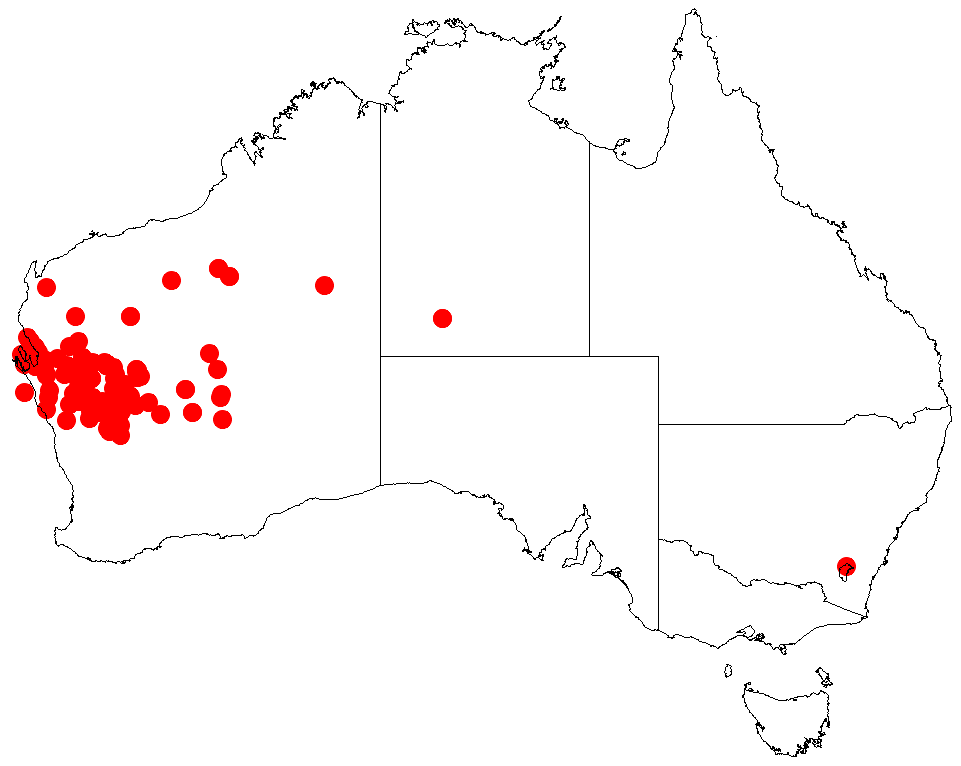
- Occurrence data from AVH

Synonyms
- Racosperma grasbyi (Maiden) Pedley

= Acacia grasbyi =

Species of plant

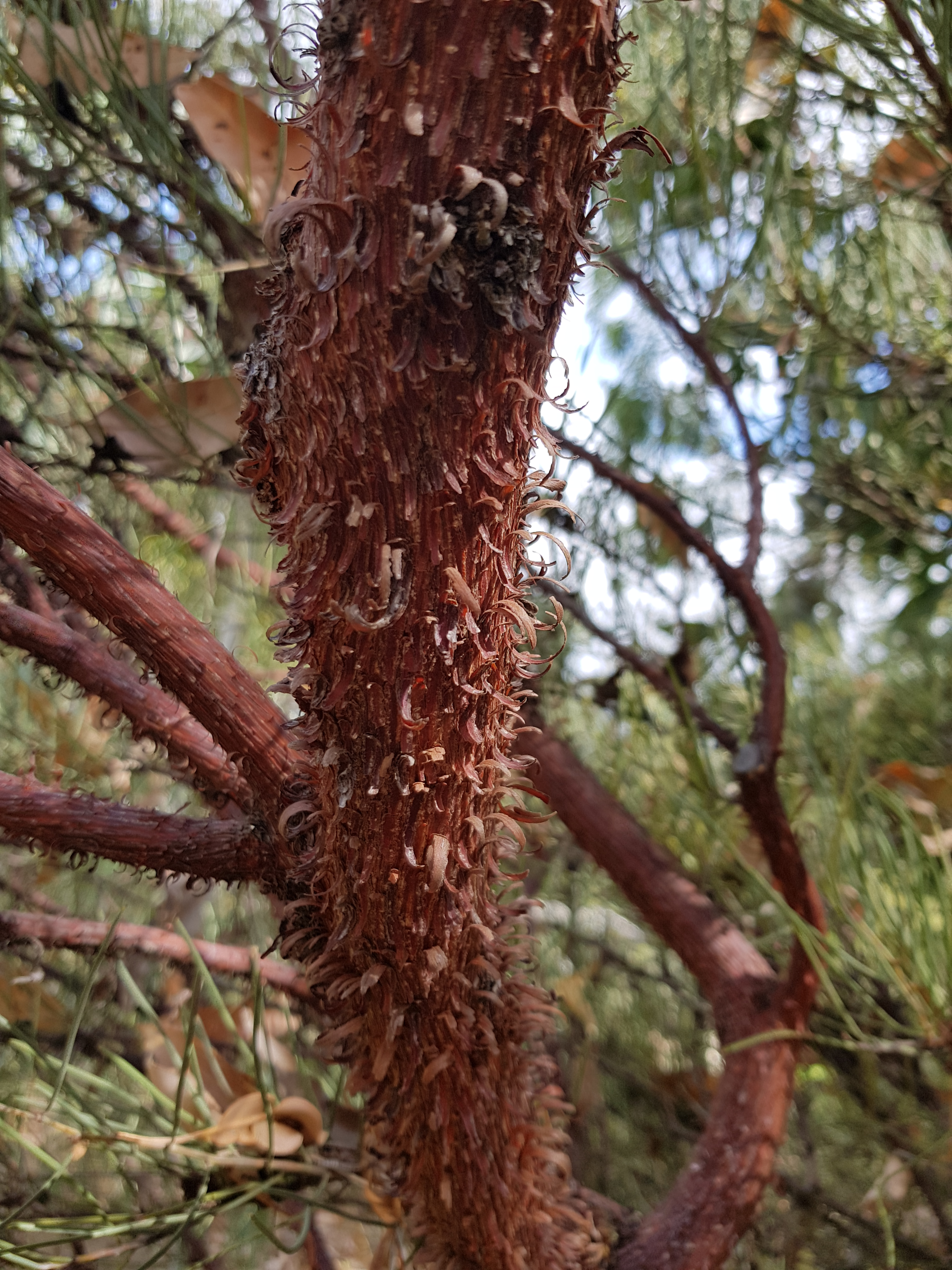
Bark

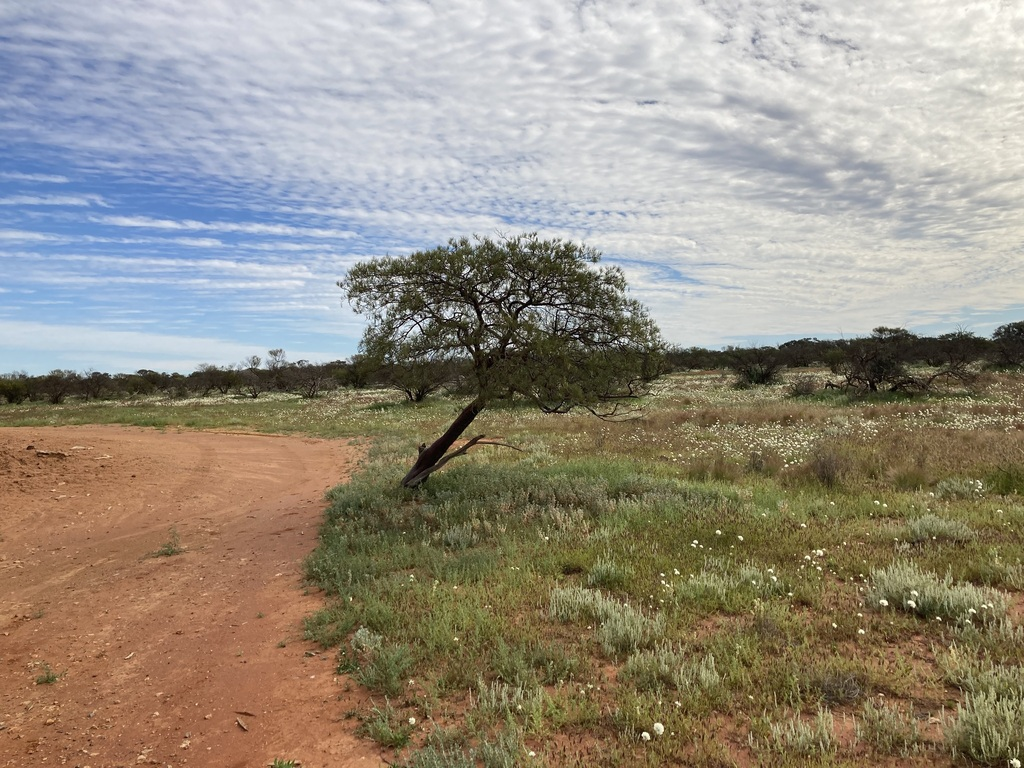
Habit near the Billabong Roadhouse

Acacia grasbyi, commonly known as miniritchie, is a species of flowering plant in the family Fabaceae and is endemic to parts of arid western and central Australia. It is a flat-topped, resinous shrub or tree with Minni ritchi bark, erect, thickly thread-like phyllodes, spikes of golden yellow flowers and linear, somewhat woody pods slightly constricted between the seeds.

== Description ==
Acacia grasbyi is a multistemmed, flat-topped, resinous shrub or tree that typically grows to a height of 1–6 m (3 ft 3 in – 19 ft 8 in) and 3–5 m (9.8–16.4 ft) wide, sometimes branching low to the ground, with reddish brown, minni ritchi bark. The branchlets are orange, grey or light brown, glabrous or with soft hairs between orange ridges and often pimply. Its phyllodes are more or less erect, thickly thread-like, more or less straight or often curved near the base, terete or subterete, mostly 40–70 mm (1.6–2.8 in) long and 1.0–1.5 mm (0.039–0.059 in) wide with a coarsely sharp tip. The flowers are golden yellow and borne in spikes 8–30 mm (0.31–1.18 in) long. Flowering occurs between March and October and the pods are linear, straight or sickle shaped, 60–110 mm (2.4–4.3 in) long, slightly constricted between the seeds, somewhat woody and covered with tiny soft hairs. The seeds are flattened or round, 6.5–9 mm (0.26–0.35 in) long and brownish black with a yellowish olive aril.

== Taxonomy ==
Acacia grasbyi was first formally described in 1917 by the botanist Joseph Maiden in the Journal and Proceedings of the Royal Society of New South Wales from specimens he collected near the Cue-Milly Soak road in 1909. The specific epithet (grasbyi) honours William Grasby, agricultural editor of the Western Mail, Perth.

== Distribution and habitat ==
Miniritchie occurs throughout the arid interior of Western Australia, especially in the Murchison district, north to the Gibson Desert and south to about 64 km (40 mi) north of Leonora, with isolated populations in the north-west of South Australia and the southern Northern Territory. In Western Australia it grows on plains, granite mesas or undulating hills, in stony red sand or loam in Acacia scrub or shrubland, in the Carnarvon, Gascoyne, Geraldton Sandplains, Great Victoria Desert, Murchison, Swan Coastal Plain, Tanami and Yalgoo bioregions of arid Western Australia.

== Conservation status ==
Acacia grasbyi is listed as "not threatened" by the Government of Western Australia Department of Biodiversity, Conservation and Attractions.

== See also ==
- List of Acacia species
