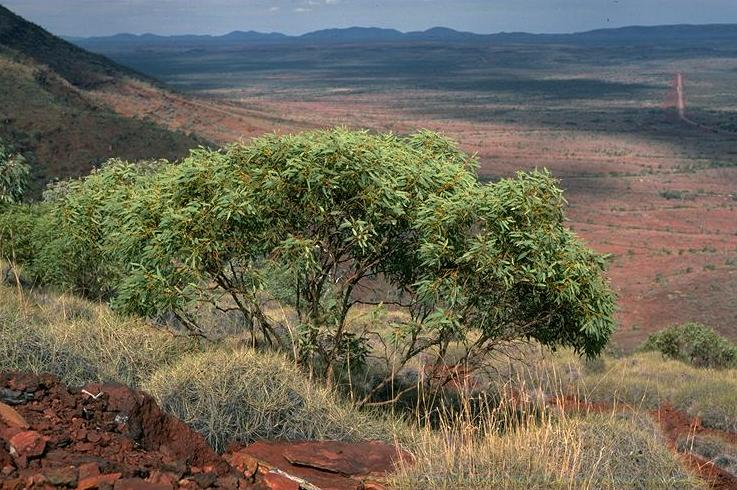
- On Mt. Robinson

Scientific classification
- Kingdom: Plantae
- Clade: Embryophytes
- Clade: Tracheophytes
- Clade: Spermatophytes
- Clade: Angiosperms
- Clade: Eudicots
- Clade: Rosids
- Order: Myrtales
- Family: Myrtaceae
- Genus: Eucalyptus
- Species: E. ewartiana

Binomial name
- Eucalyptus ewartiana Maiden

= Eucalyptus ewartiana =

Ewart's mallee

Species of eucalyptus

Eucalyptus ewartiana, commonly known as Ewart's mallee, is a species of mallee that is endemic to Western Australia. It has reddish brown, minni ritchi bark, narrow lance-shaped to egg-shaped adult leaves, flower buds in groups of seven, white flowers and conical to hemispherical fruit.

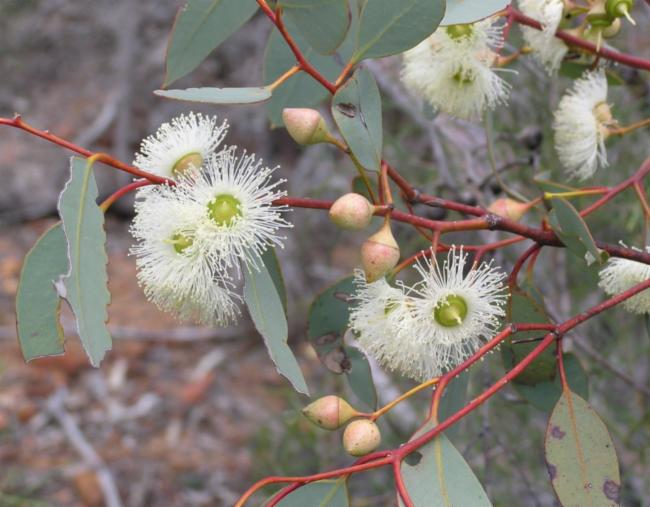
Buds and flowers

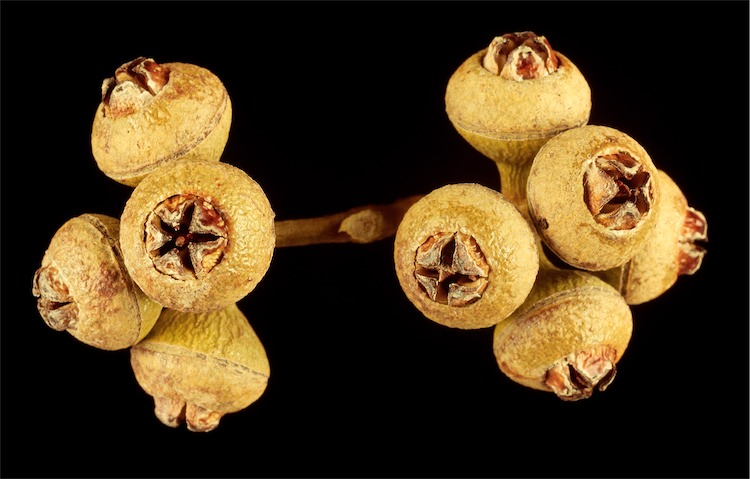
Fruit

== Description ==
Eucalyptus ewartiana is a mallee that typically grows to a height of 2–7 m (6 ft 7 in – 23 ft 0 in) and has reddish brown minni-ritchi type bark and forms a lignotuber. Young plants and coppice regrowth have egg-shaped, petiolate leaves 50–80 mm (2.0–3.1 in) long and 15–50 mm (0.59–1.97 in) wide. Adult leaves are narrow lance-shaped to egg-shaped, the same shade of dull green to greyish on both sides, 45–95 mm (1.8–3.7 in) long and 10–30 mm (0.39–1.18 in) wide on a petiole 7–25 mm (0.28–0.98 in) long. The flower buds are arranged in leaf axils in groups of seven on an unbranched peduncle 5–20 mm (0.20–0.79 in) long, the individual buds on a pedicel 3–7 mm (0.12–0.28 in) long. Mature buds are spherical to oval, 6–9 mm (0.24–0.35 in) long and 5–7 mm (0.20–0.28 in) wide with a rounded operculum. Flowering occurs between August and February and the flowers are white. The fruit is a woody conical to hemispherical capsule 2–6 mm (0.079–0.236 in) long and 7–13 mm (0.28–0.51 in) wide with the valves protruding above the rim.

== Taxonomy and naming ==
Eucalyptus ewartiana was first formally described in 1919 by Joseph Maiden from a specimen he collected near Pindar in 1909. The description was published in Journal and Proceedings of the Royal Society of New South Wales. The specific epithet (ewartiana) honours Alfred James Ewart.

== Distribution and habitat ==
Ewart's mallee is found on sandplains and among granite outcrops and is spread throughout the Mid West, Wheatbelt, Pilbara and Goldfields-Esperance regions of Western Australia where it grows in loamy-sandy soils.

== Conservation status ==
This eucalypt is classified as "not threatened" by the Western Australian Government Department of Parks and Wildlife.

== See also ==
- List of Eucalyptus species
