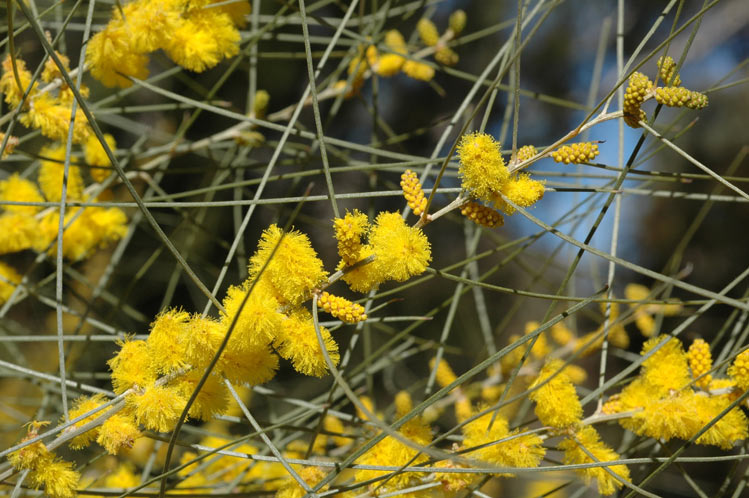

Conservation status
- Vulnerable (EPBC Act)

Scientific classification
- Kingdom: Plantae
- Clade: Tracheophytes
- Clade: Angiosperms
- Clade: Eudicots
- Clade: Rosids
- Order: Fabales
- Family: Fabaceae
- Subfamily: Caesalpinioideae
- Clade: Mimosoid clade
- Genus: Acacia
- Species: A. curranii

Binomial name
- Acacia curranii Maiden
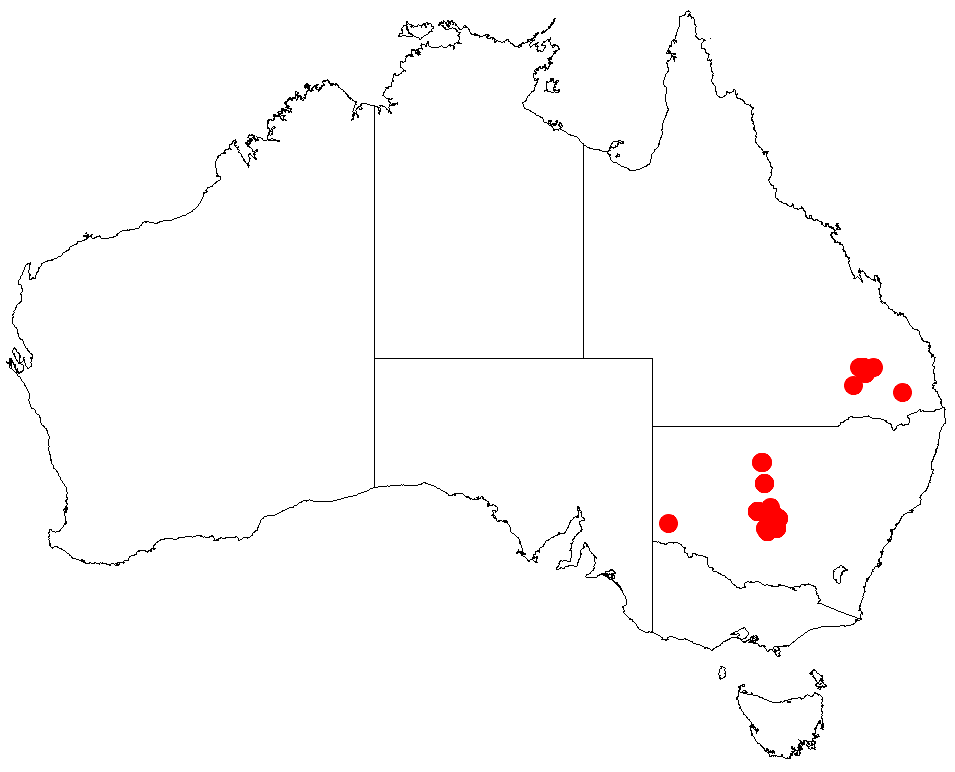
- Occurrence data from AVH

Synonyms
- Acacia currani Maiden orth. var.; Acacia cyperophylla F.Muell. ex Benth. p.p.; Racosperma curranii (Maiden) Pedley

= Acacia curranii =

Curly-bark wattle

Species of legume

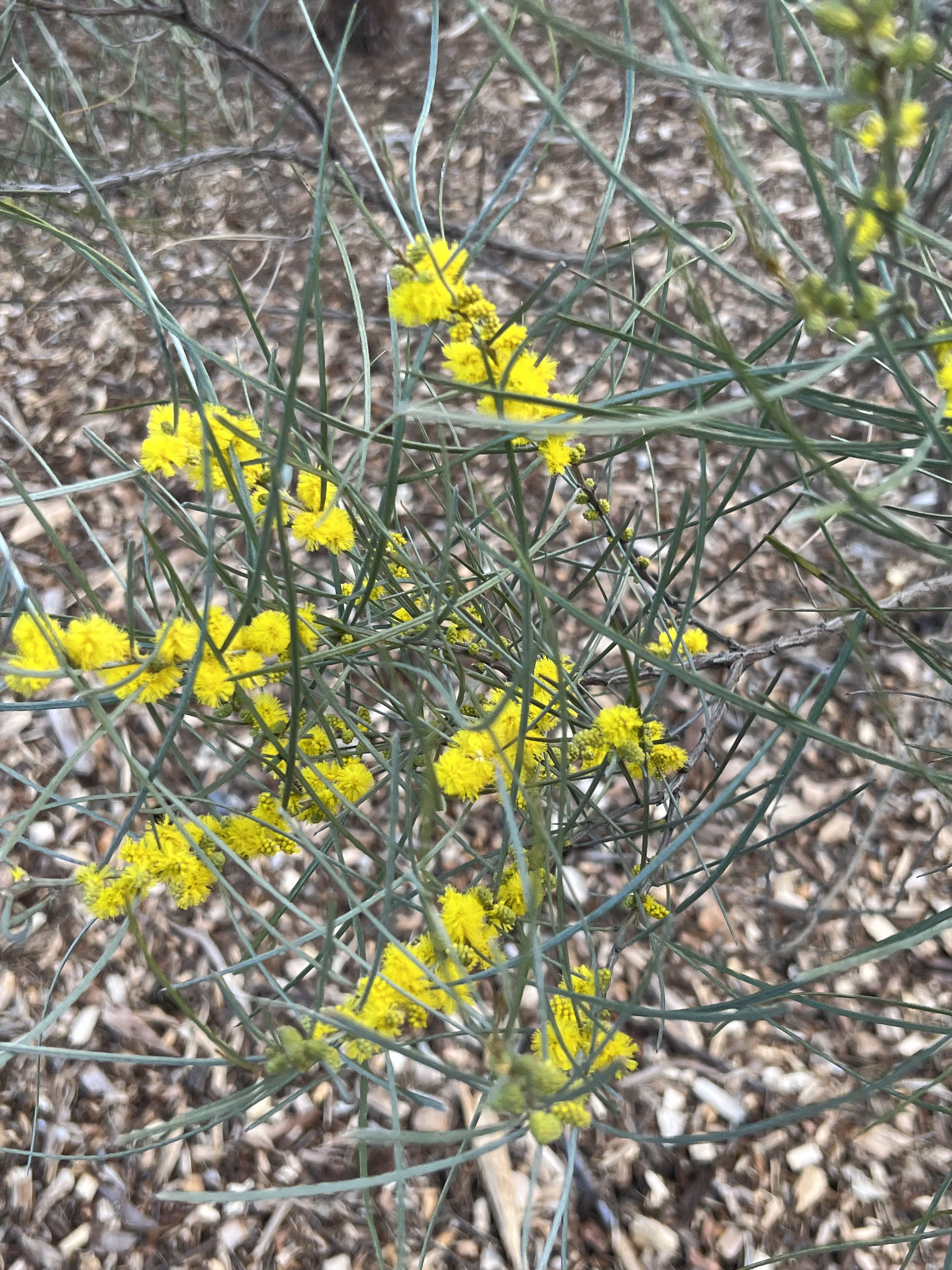
In the Australian National Botanic Gardens

Acacia curranii, also known as curly-bark wattle or Curran's wattle, is a species of flowering plant in the family Fabaceae and is endemic to eastern Australia. It is a multi-stemmed shrub with Minni ritchi bark, sometimes hairy branchlets, erect linear phyllodes, spikes of golden yellow flowers and linear, firmly papery pods.

== Description ==
Acacia curranii is a multistemmed shrub that typically grows to a height of up to 3 m (9.8 ft) and has maroon or grey 'Minni Ritchi' bark. Its phyllodes are erect, linear, more or less terete or flattened, 85–180 mm (3.3–7.1 in) long, usually 0.5–1.5 mm (0.020–0.059 in) wide and striated, with about 25 closely parallel veins. There is a gland up to 2.3 mm (0.091 in) above the base of the phyllodes. The flowers are borne in spikes 4–12 mm (0.16–0.47 in) long of golden yellow flowers. Flowering occurs from July to September, and the pods are linear, flat to more or less straight sided to slightly constricted between the seeds, 40–70 mm (1.6–2.8 in) long, 2.0–3.5 mm (0.079–0.138 in) wide and firmly papery. The seeds are more or less narrowly oblong, 3.0–3.3 mm (0.12–0.13 in) long and dark brown.

== Taxonomy ==
Acacia curranii was first formally described in 1916 by Joseph Maiden in the Journal and Proceedings of the Royal Society of New South Wales from specimens apparently collected near Cobar by "Rev. J. Milne Curran, F.G.S.". The specific epithet (curranii) honours the collector of the type specimens.

== Distribution and habitat ==
Curly-bark wattle has a disjunct distribution, occurring in the Darling Downs in the Gurulmundi area in south-eastern Queensland, and several hundred kilometres away around Lake Cargelligo and the Gunderbooka Range in New South Wales. It grows in poorly drained sandy soils overlying sandstone in the north and skeletal soils on igneous hills in the south.

== Conservation status ==
Acacia curranii is listed as "vulnerable" under the Australian Government Environment Protection and Biodiversity Conservation Act 1999, the New South Wales Government Biodiversity Conservation Act 2016 and the Queensland Government Nature Conservation Act 1992.

== See also ==
- List of Acacia species
