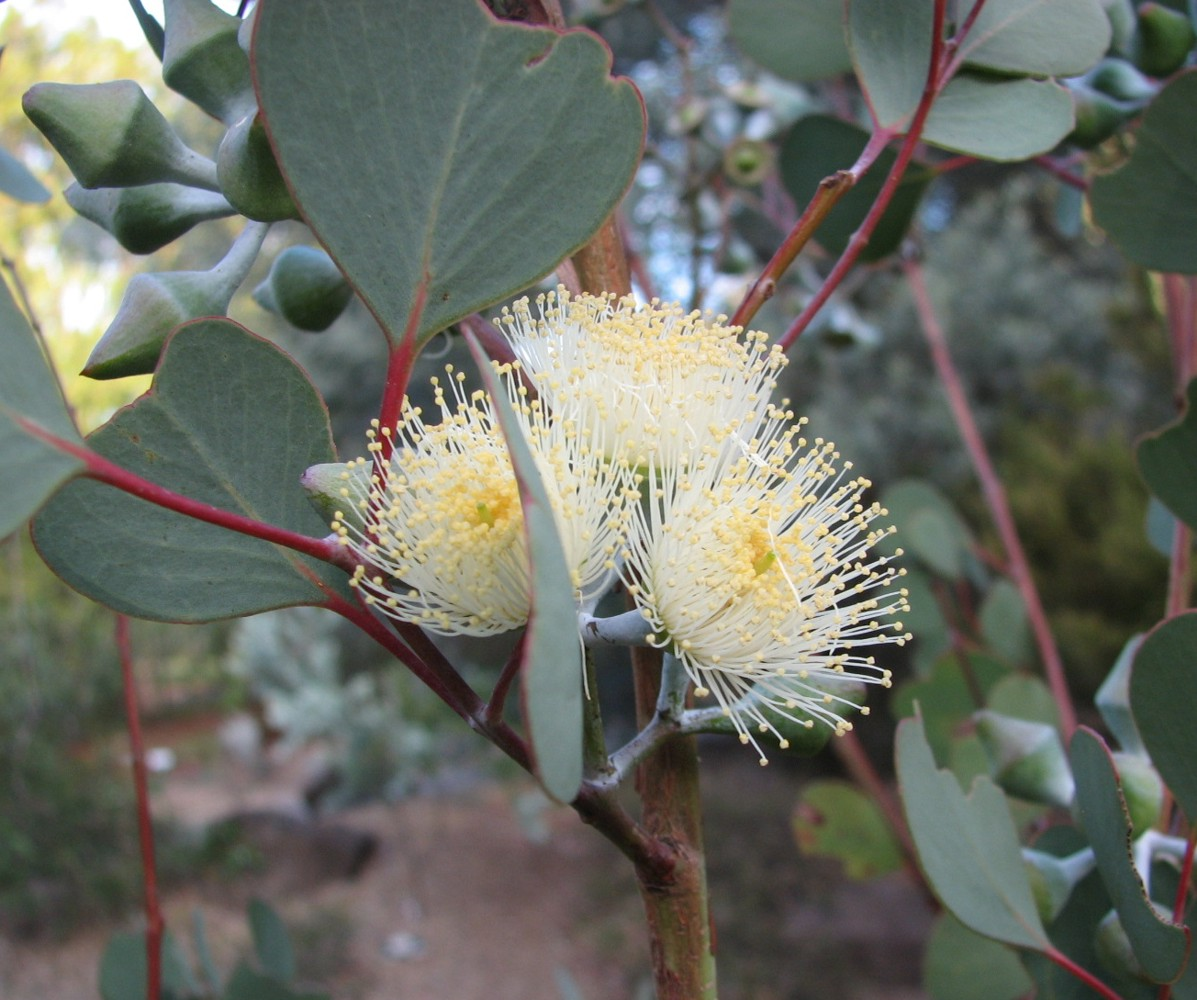

Scientific classification
- Kingdom: Plantae
- Clade: Tracheophytes
- Clade: Angiosperms
- Clade: Eudicots
- Clade: Rosids
- Order: Myrtales
- Family: Myrtaceae
- Genus: Eucalyptus
- Species: E. orbifolia

Binomial name
- Eucalyptus orbifolia F.Muell.

Synonyms
- Eucalyptus lata L.A.S.Johnson & K.D.Hill; Eucalyptus websteriana auct. non Maiden: Jessop, J.P. in Jessop, J.P. & Toelken, H.R. (ed.) (1986), Myrtaceae.

= Eucalyptus orbifolia =

Round-leaved Mallee

Species of eucalyptus

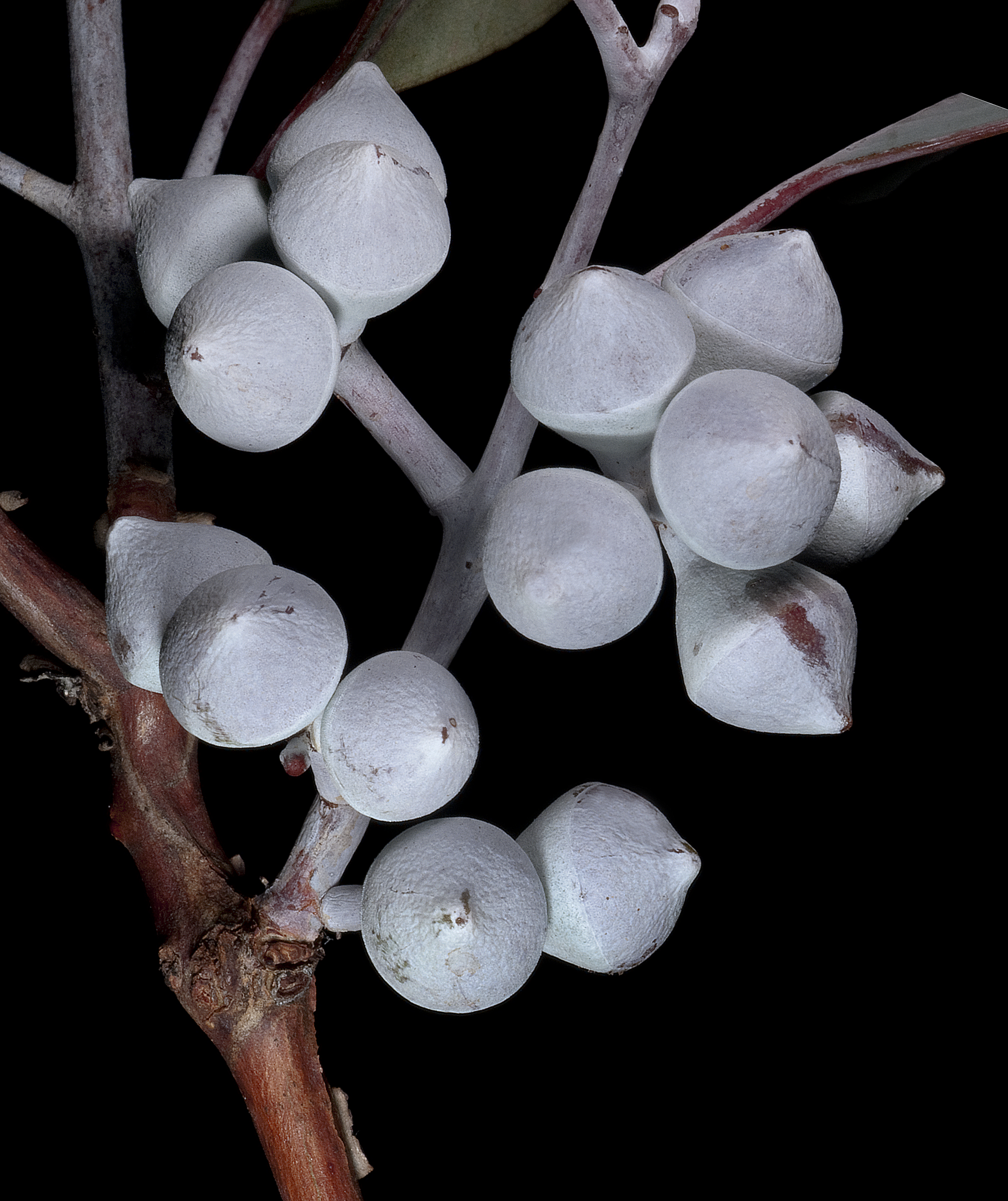
Flower buds

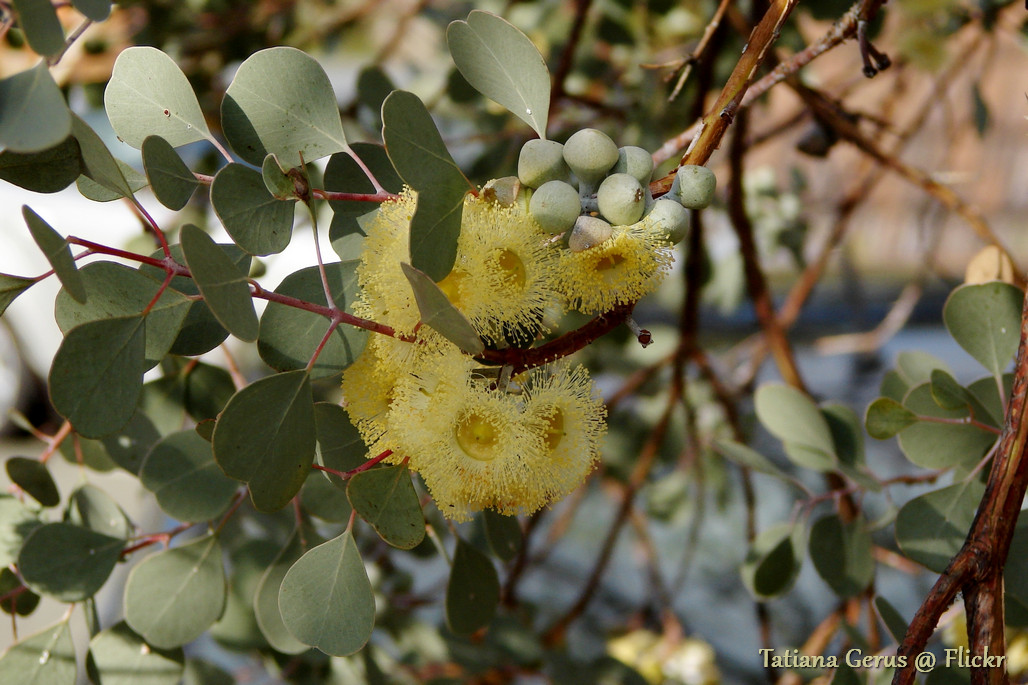
Foliage and flowers

Eucalyptus orbifolia, commonly known as round-leaved mallee, is a species of flowering plant in the family Myrtaceae and is endemic to inland Australia. It is a tree or mallee with rough bark, oval leaves, yellow flowers and conical fruit.

== Description ==
Eucalyptus orbifolia is a mallee or tree that typically grows to a height of 2.5 to 8 metres (8 to 26 ft). The tree produces showy cream-yellow flowers predominantly between mid-winter and late spring from July to November. It has rough minni ritchi bark on the trunk. Like most mallees it has multiple stems. The bark is reddish brown in colour and which peels and curls outwards, exposing paler white-grey bark below. The grey-green, oval-shaped adult leaves are 25 to 40 millimetres (1.0 to 1.6 in) in length and 15 to 40 mm (0.6 to 1.6 in) wide. Each inflorescence is 20 to 25 mm (0.8 to 1.0 in) in diameter.

== Taxonomy ==
Eucalyptus orbifolia was first formally described in 1859 by Ferdinand von Mueller in Fragmenta Phytographiae Australiae from specimens collected by Charles Harper.

The name is sometimes misapplied to Eucalyptus websteriana described by Joseph Maiden in 1916 in the Journal and Proceedings of the Royal Society of New South Wales.

The specific epithet (orbifolia) is from Latin meaning "round" and "-leaved".

== Distribution ==
It is found amongst granite outcrops and on slopes and ridges in the Mid West, Wheatbelt and Goldfields regions of Western Australia between Mount Magnet, Mukinbudin and Kalgoorlie where it grows in shallow gravelly red sandy or sandy-clay soils. The range extends into central Australia west of Alice Springs in the Northern Territory and northern South Australia.

== Use in horticulture ==
The mallee is sold as seed or as seedlings. It will grow well in a full sun position and is drought and frost tolerant when established. Suitable as an ornamental or as a light screen, it also attracts native birds. The seeds propagate easily and it can be grown in a large container.

== See also ==
- List of Eucalyptus species
