= Minni ritchi =

Type of tree bark

Minni ritchi bark on an acacia in the Pilbara region of Western Australia

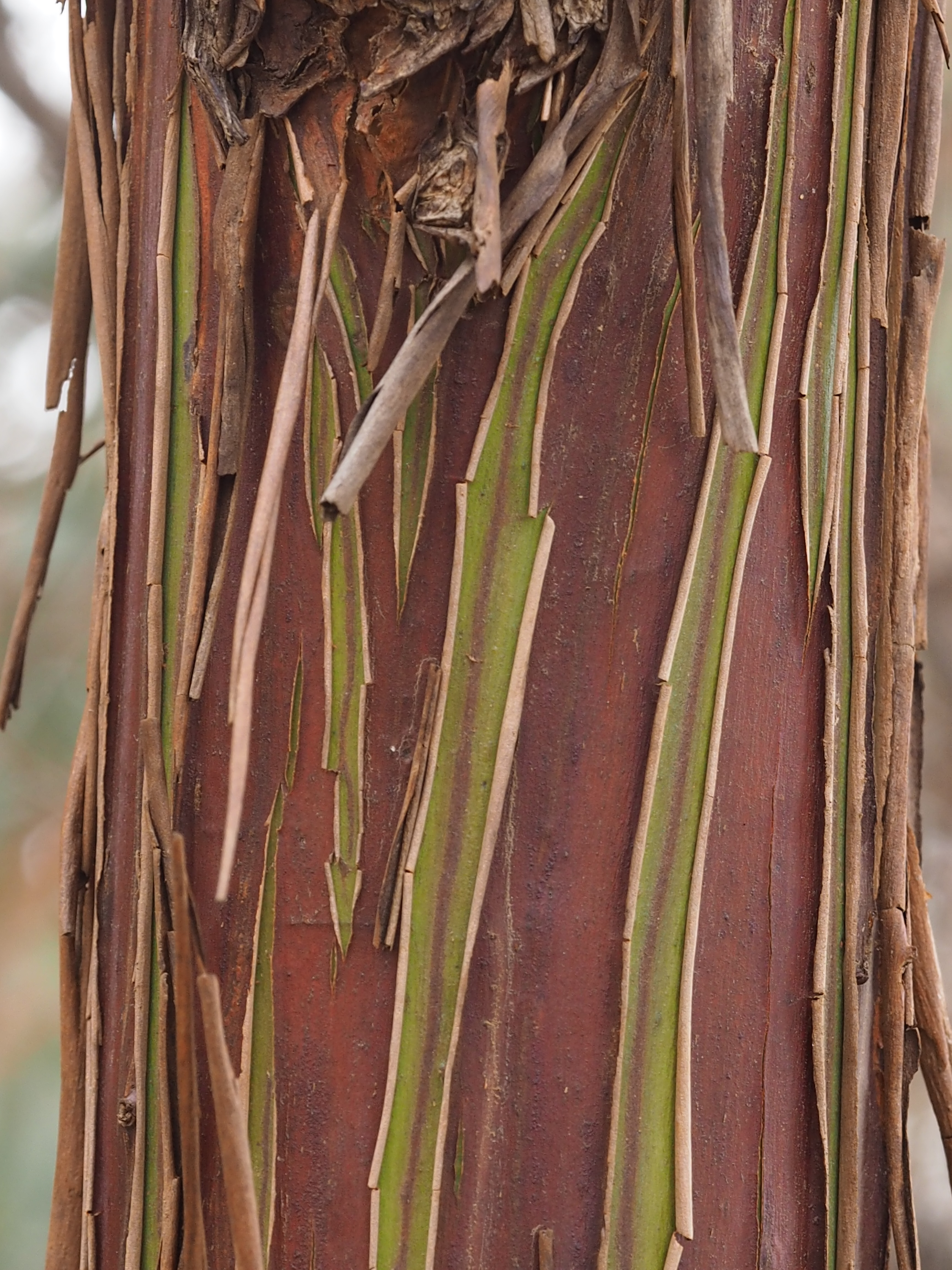
Minni ritchi bark of Eucalyptus crucis near Wongan Hills

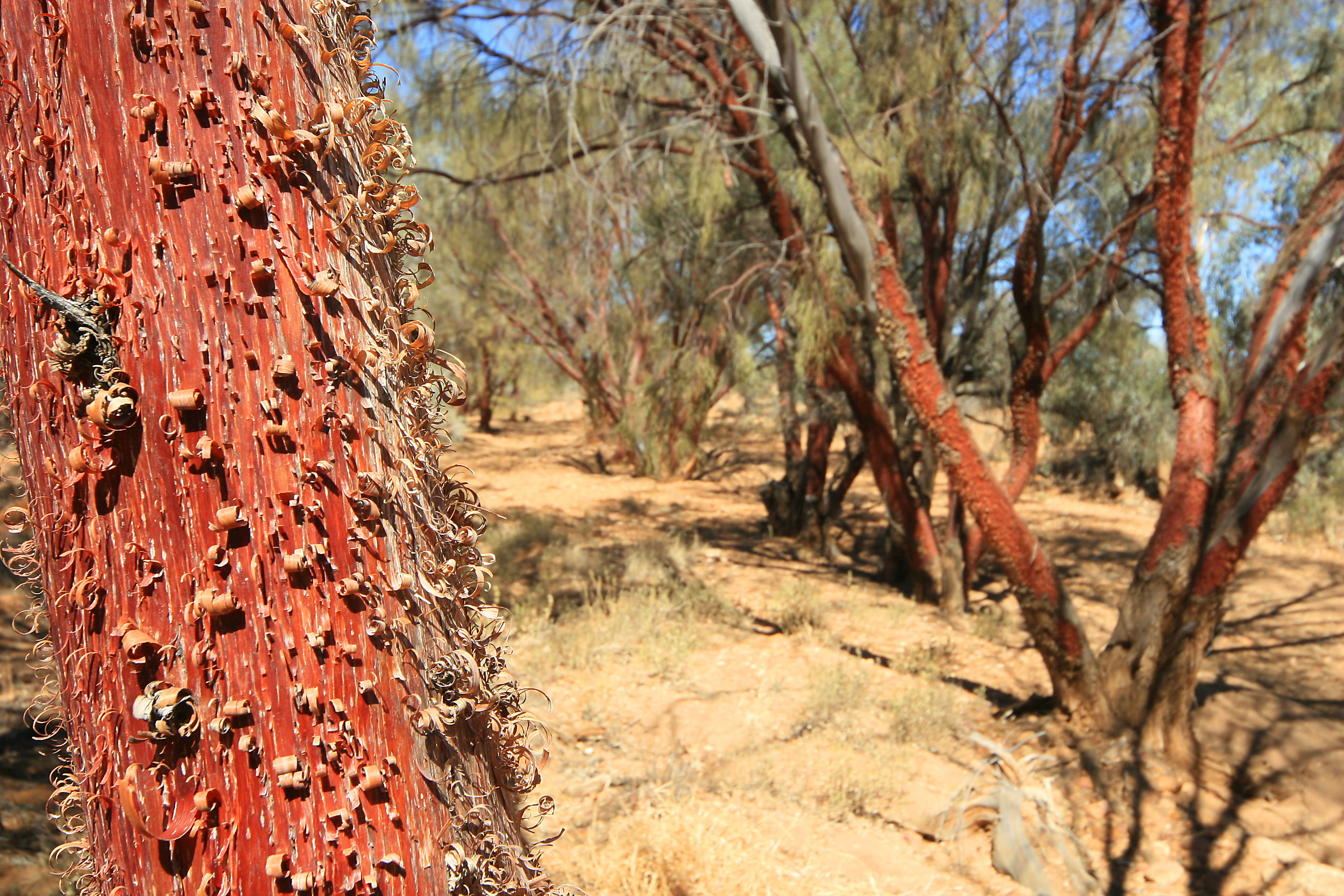
Acacia cyperophylla

Minni ritchi is a type of reddish-brown bark that continuously peels in small curly flakes, leaving the tree looking like it has a coat of red curly hair. Brooker and Kleinig (1990) described it as a bark type in which "the bark seems rough at first glance and on close inspection is seen to be formed of partly shed longitudinal strips that curl outwards, initially exposing pale or greenish underbark".

A number of species of Acacia and Eucalyptus have minni ritchi bark, including:

- Acacia curranii
- Acacia cyperophylla (creekline miniritchie)
- Acacia delibrata
- Acacia gracillima
- Acacia grasbyi (miniritchie)
- Acacia monticola
- Acacia rhodophloia
- Acacia trachycarpa
- Eucalyptus caesia (gungurru, 'Silver Princess')
- Eucalyptus crucis (narrow-leaved silver mallee)
- Eucalyptus minniritchi
- Eucalyptus orbifolia
