= List of Australian plant species authored by Joseph Maiden =

This is a list of Australian plant species authored by Joseph Maiden, including naturalised species:

- Acacia abrupta Maiden & Blakely
- Acacia acellerata Maiden & Blakely
- Acacia adsurgens Maiden & Blakely
- Acacia alleniana Maiden
- Acacia ancistrocarpa Maiden & Blakely
- Acacia angusta Maiden & Blakely
- Acacia armitii F.Muell. ex Maiden
- Acacia attenuata Maiden & Blakely
- Acacia baeuerlenii Maiden & R.T.Baker
- Acacia bakeri Maiden
- Acacia bancroftiorum Maiden
- Acacia basedowii Maiden
- Acacia betchei Maiden & Blakely
- Acacia blakelyi Maiden
- Acacia boormanii Maiden
- Acacia burrowii Maiden
- Acacia caesiella Maiden & Blakely
- Acacia calcarata Maiden & Blakely
- Acacia cana Maiden
- Acacia carneorum Maiden
- Acacia centrinervia Maiden & Blakely
- Acacia chalkeri Maiden
- Acacia chrysella Maiden & Blakely
- Acacia chrysopoda Maiden & Blakely
- Acacia clunies-rossiae Maiden
- Acacia confluens Maiden & Blakely
- Acacia coolgardiensis Maiden
- Acacia curranii Maiden
- Acacia curvinervia Maiden
- Acacia deflexa Maiden & Blakely
- Acacia desertorum Maiden & Blakely
- Acacia difficilis Maiden
- Acacia dorothea Maiden
- Acacia dunnii (Maiden) Turrill
- Acacia enervia Maiden & Blakely
- Acacia eriopoda Maiden & Blakely
- Acacia excentrica Maiden & Blakely
- Acacia fauntleroyi (Maiden) Maiden & Blakely
- Acacia ferocior Maiden
- Acacia flocktoniae Maiden
- Acacia forsythii Maiden & Blakely
- Acacia fragilis Maiden & Blakely
- Acacia froggattii Maiden
- Acacia gardneri Maiden & Blakely
- Acacia gillii (Maiden) Maiden & Blakely
- Acacia glaucocarpa Maiden & Blakely
- Acacia glutinosissima Maiden & Blakely
- Acacia gracilifolia Maiden & Blakely
- Acacia granitica Maiden
- Acacia grasbyi Maiden
- Acacia hamiltoniana Maiden
- Acacia hammondii Maiden
- Acacia havilandiorum Maiden
- Acacia helmsiana Maiden
- Acacia hemsleyi Maiden
- Acacia hilliana Maiden
- Acacia inophloia Maiden & Blakely
- Acacia inops Maiden & Blakely
- Acacia jennerae Maiden
- Acacia jensenii Maiden
- Acacia jibberdingensis Maiden & Blakely
- Acacia jonesii F.Muell. & Maiden
- Acacia jucunda Maiden & Blakely
- Acacia kettlewelliae Maiden
- Acacia kingiana Maiden & Blakely
- Acacia kybeanensis Maiden & Blakely
- Acacia lentiginea Maiden & Blakely
- Acacia linearifolia Maiden & Blakely
- Acacia loderi Maiden
- Acacia longiphyllodinea Maiden
- Acacia mabellae Maiden
- Acacia macnuttiana Maiden & Blakely
- Acacia malloclada Maiden & Blakely
- Acacia maxwellii Maiden & Blakely
- Acacia merrickiae Maiden & Blakely
- Acacia mollifolia Maiden & Blakely
- Acacia muelleriana Maiden & R.T.Baker
- Acacia nigripilosa Maiden
- Acacia obtecta Maiden & Blakely
- Acacia orbifolia Maiden & Blakely
- Acacia oshanesii F.Muell. & Maiden
- Acacia pachyacra Maiden & Blakely
- Acacia pilligaensis Maiden
- Acacia prainii Maiden
- Acacia proxima Maiden
- Acacia ptychoclada Maiden & Blakely
- Acacia pulviniformis Maiden & Blakely
- Acacia pustula Maiden & Blakely
- Acacia rendlei Maiden
- Acacia rhodoxylon Maiden
- Acacia ruppii Maiden & Betche
- Acacia sedifolia Maiden & Blakely
- Acacia semicircinalis Maiden & Blakely
- Acacia semilunata Maiden & Blakely
- Acacia semirigida Maiden & Blakely
- Acacia sessilispica Maiden & Blakely
- Acacia shirleyi Maiden
- Acacia sparsiflora Maiden
- Acacia steedmanii Maiden & Blakely
- Acacia stowardii Maiden
- Acacia subflexuosa Maiden
- Acacia tenuior Maiden
- Acacia tropica (Maiden & Blakely) Tindale
- Acacia validinervia Maiden & Blakely
- Acacia viscifolia Maiden & Blakely
- Acacia websteri Maiden & Blakely
- Acacia whitei Maiden
- Actinotus forsythii Maiden & Betche
- Alloxylon pinnatum (Maiden & Betche) P.H.Weston & Crisp
- Almaleea cambagei (Maiden & Betche) Crisp & P.H.Weston
- Archidendron muellerianum (Maiden & R.T.Baker) I.C.Nielsen
- Atriplex kochiana Maiden
- Baeckea denticulata Maiden & Betche
- Blechnum norfolkianum (Heward) Maiden
- Boronia deanei Maiden & Betche
- Boronia glabra (Maiden & Betche) Cheel
- Boronia granitica Maiden & Betche
- Boronia repanda (F.Muell. ex Maiden & Betche) Maiden & Betche
- Calotis inermis Maiden & Betche
- Capparis arborea (F.Muell.) Maiden
- Corymbia bloxsomei (Maiden) K.D.Hill & L.A.S.Johnson
- Corymbia gilbertensis (Maiden & Blakely) K.D.Hill & L.A.S.Johnson
- Corymbia haematoxylon (Maiden) K.D.Hill & L.A.S.Johnson
- Cryptocarya erythroxylon Maiden & Betche ex Maiden
- Cryptocarya gregsonii Maiden
- Ctenopteris walleri (Maiden & Betche) S.B.Andrews
- Dodonaea camfieldii Maiden & Betche
- Dodonaea hirsuta (Maiden & Betche) Maiden & Betche
- Endiandra globosa Maiden & Betche
- Epacris hamiltonii Maiden & Betche
- Eriachne glabrata (Maiden) W.Hartley
- Eucalyptus acaciiformis H.Deane & Maiden
- Eucalyptus agglomerata Maiden
- Eucalyptus aggregata H.Deane & Maiden
- Eucalyptus albida Maiden & Blakely
- Eucalyptus andrewsii Maiden
- Eucalyptus approximans Maiden
- Eucalyptus archeri Maiden & Blakely
- Eucalyptus astringens (Maiden) Maiden
- Eucalyptus bakeri Maiden
- Eucalyptus bancroftii (Maiden) Maiden
- Eucalyptus banksii Maiden
- Eucalyptus baxteri (Benth.) Maiden & Blakely ex J.M.Black
- Eucalyptus benthamii Maiden & Cambage
- Eucalyptus blakelyi Maiden
- Eucalyptus blaxlandii Maiden & Cambage
- Eucalyptus brownii Maiden & Cambage
- Eucalyptus burracoppinensis Maiden & Blakely
- Eucalyptus caleyi Maiden
- Eucalyptus cambageana Maiden
- Eucalyptus camfieldii Maiden
- Eucalyptus canaliculata Maiden
- Eucalyptus clelandii (Maiden) Maiden
- Eucalyptus concinna Maiden & Blakely
- Eucalyptus confluens Maiden
- Eucalyptus conglobata (Benth.) Maiden
- Eucalyptus conglomerata Maiden & Blakely
- Eucalyptus conica H.Deane & Maiden
- Eucalyptus consideniana Maiden
- Eucalyptus crucis Maiden
- Eucalyptus cylindriflora Maiden & Blakely
- Eucalyptus dalrympleana Maiden
- Eucalyptus deanei Maiden
- Eucalyptus decorticans (Bailey) Maiden
- Eucalyptus desmondensis Maiden & Blakely
- Eucalyptus dongarraensis Maiden & Blakely
- Eucalyptus dundasii Maiden
- Eucalyptus dunnii Maiden
- Eucalyptus dwyeri Maiden & Blakely
- Eucalyptus ebbanoensis Maiden
- Eucalyptus eremophila (Diels) Maiden
- Eucalyptus ewartiana Maiden
- Eucalyptus fastigata H.Deane & Maiden
- Eucalyptus flocktoniae (Maiden) Maiden
- Eucalyptus fraxinoides H.Deane & Maiden
- Eucalyptus gardneri Maiden
- Eucalyptus gilbertensis (Maiden & Blakely) S.T.Blake
- Eucalyptus gillii Maiden
- Eucalyptus glaucescens Maiden & Blakely
- Eucalyptus grasbyi Maiden & Blakely
- Eucalyptus griffithsii Maiden
- Eucalyptus guilfoylei Maiden
- Eucalyptus haematoxylon Maiden
- Eucalyptus herbertiana Maiden
- Eucalyptus houseana Maiden
- Eucalyptus jacksonii Maiden
- Eucalyptus jensenii Maiden
- Eucalyptus johnstonii Maiden
- Eucalyptus jutsonii Maiden
- Eucalyptus kessellii Maiden & Blakely
- Eucalyptus kingsmillii (Maiden) Maiden & Blakely
- Eucalyptus kitsoniana Maiden
- Eucalyptus kochii Maiden & Blakely
- Eucalyptus kondininensis Maiden & Blakely
- Eucalyptus kybeanensis Maiden & Cambage
- Eucalyptus lane-poolei Maiden
- Eucalyptus lesouefii Maiden
- Eucalyptus lirata W.Fitzg. ex Maiden
- Eucalyptus longicornis (F.Muell.) F.Muell. ex Maiden
- Eucalyptus macarthurii H.Deane & Maiden
- Eucalyptus major (Maiden) Blakely
- Eucalyptus melanoxylon Maiden
- Eucalyptus merrickiae Maiden & Blakely
- Eucalyptus microcarpa (Maiden) Maiden
- Eucalyptus microneura Maiden & Blakely
- Eucalyptus mooreana W.Fitzg. ex Maiden
- Eucalyptus moorei Maiden & Cambage
- Eucalyptus neglecta Maiden
- Eucalyptus nicholii Maiden & Blakely
- Eucalyptus nitens (H.Deane & Maiden) Maiden
- Eucalyptus normantonensis Maiden & Cambage
- Eucalyptus notabilis Maiden
- Eucalyptus nova-anglica H.Deane & Maiden
- Eucalyptus orgadophila Maiden & Blakely
- Eucalyptus ovularis Maiden & Blakely
- Eucalyptus pachycalyx Maiden & Blakely
- Eucalyptus pilligaensis Maiden
- Eucalyptus pimpiniana Maiden
- Eucalyptus platycorys Maiden & Blakely
- Eucalyptus praecox Maiden
- Eucalyptus propinqua H.Deane & Maiden
- Eucalyptus pseudoglobulus Naudin ex Maiden
- Eucalyptus quadrangulata H.Deane & Maiden
- Eucalyptus rigidula Maiden
- Eucalyptus rubida H.Deane & Maiden
- Eucalyptus rudderi Maiden
- Eucalyptus rummeryi Maiden
- Eucalyptus sargentii Maiden
- Eucalyptus scoparia Maiden
- Eucalyptus scyphocalyx (F.Muell. ex Benth.) Maiden & Blakely
- Eucalyptus seeana Maiden
- Eucalyptus sessilis (Maiden) Blakely
- Eucalyptus sheathiana Maiden
- Eucalyptus shirleyi Maiden
- Eucalyptus similis Maiden
- Eucalyptus squamosa H.Deane & Maiden
- Eucalyptus staeri (Maiden) Kessell & C.A.Gardner
- Eucalyptus stowardii Maiden
- Eucalyptus stricklandii Maiden
- Eucalyptus subcrenulata Maiden & Blakely
- Eucalyptus tenuipes (Maiden & Blakely) Blakely & C.T.White
- Eucalyptus transcontinentalis Maiden
- Eucalyptus triflora (Maiden) Blakely
- Eucalyptus umbrawarrensis Maiden
- Eucalyptus websteriana Maiden
- Eucalyptus whitei Maiden & Blakely
- Eucalyptus woodwardii Maiden
- Eucalyptus yarraensis Maiden & Cambage
- Eucalyptus yilgarnensis (Maiden) Brooker
- Euryomyrtus denticulata (Maiden & Betche) Trudgen
- Goodenia dimorpha Maiden & Betche
- Goodenia glomerata Maiden & Betche
- Goodenia havilandii Maiden & Betche
- Hakea bakeriana F.Muell. & Maiden
- Haloragodendron lucasii (Maiden & Betche) Orchard
- Helichrysum boormanii Maiden & Betche
- Hibbertia elata Maiden & Betche
- Homoranthus darwinioides (Maiden & Betche) Cheel
- Hymenophyllum walleri Maiden & Betche
- Isolepis australiensis (Maiden & Betche) K.L.Wilson
- Kunzea bracteolata Maiden & Betche
- Kunzea cambagei Maiden & Betche
- Lasiopetalum longistamineum Maiden & Betche
- Leptochloa decipiens (R.Br.) Maiden
- Leptospermum macrocarpum (Maiden & Betche) Joy Thomps.
- Leptospermum rotundifolium (Maiden & Betche) F.Rodway ex Cheel
- Leucopogon fletcheri Maiden & Betche
- Macadamia integrifolia Maiden & Betche
- Melaleuca alternifolia Maiden & Betche ex Cheel
- Micromyrtus hexamera (Maiden & Betche) Maiden & Betche
- Olearia flocktoniae Maiden & Betche
- Olearia microphylla (Vent.) Maiden & Betche
- Ozothamnus tesselatus (Maiden & R.T.Baker) Anderb.
- Pandorea baileyana (Maiden & R.T.Baker) Steenis
- Parsonsia rotata Maiden & Betche
- Phebalium nottii (F.Muell.) Maiden & Betche
- Phebalium stenophyllum (Benth.) Maiden & Betche
- Plantago hedleyi Maiden
- Podolepis robusta (Maiden & Betche) J.H.Willis
- Polycarpaea holtzei Maiden & Betche
- Prasophyllum fitzgeraldii R.S.Rogers & Maiden
- Prostanthera granitica Maiden & Betche
- Prostanthera teretifolia Maiden & Betche
- Pultenaea campbellii Maiden & Betche
- Pultenaea luehmannii Maiden
- Pultenaea vrolandii Maiden
- Pultenaea williamsonii Maiden
- Rapanea sp. Richmond River (J.H.Maiden & J.L.Boorman NSW 26751) NSW Herbarium
- Rhodanthe microglossa (Maiden & Betche) Paul G.Wilson
- Rulingia procumbens Maiden & Betche
- Rulingia prostrata Maiden & Betche
- Rupicola sprengelioides Maiden & Betche
- Spartothamnella puberula (F.Muell.) Maiden & Betche
- Swainsona bracteata (Maiden & Betche) Joy Thomps.
- Themeda avenacea (F.Muell.) Maiden & Betche
- Uranthoecium truncatum (Maiden & Betche) Stapf
- Westringia cheelii Maiden & Betche
- Zieria robusta Maiden & Betche
