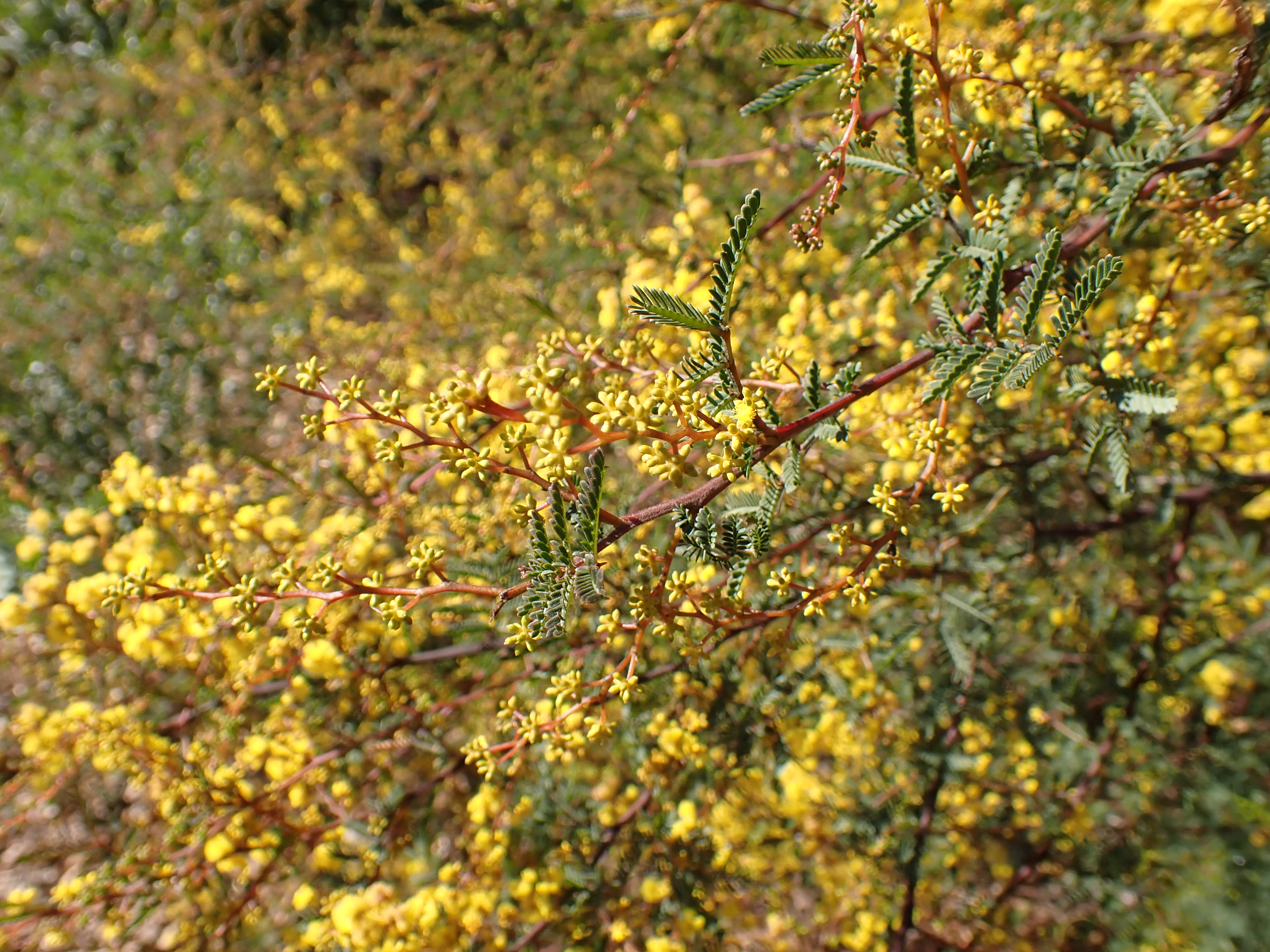

Scientific classification
- Kingdom: Plantae
- Clade: Tracheophytes
- Clade: Angiosperms
- Clade: Eudicots
- Clade: Rosids
- Order: Fabales
- Family: Fabaceae
- Subfamily: Caesalpinioideae
- Clade: Mimosoid clade
- Genus: Acacia
- Species: A. jonesii

Binomial name
- Acacia jonesii F.Muell. & Maiden
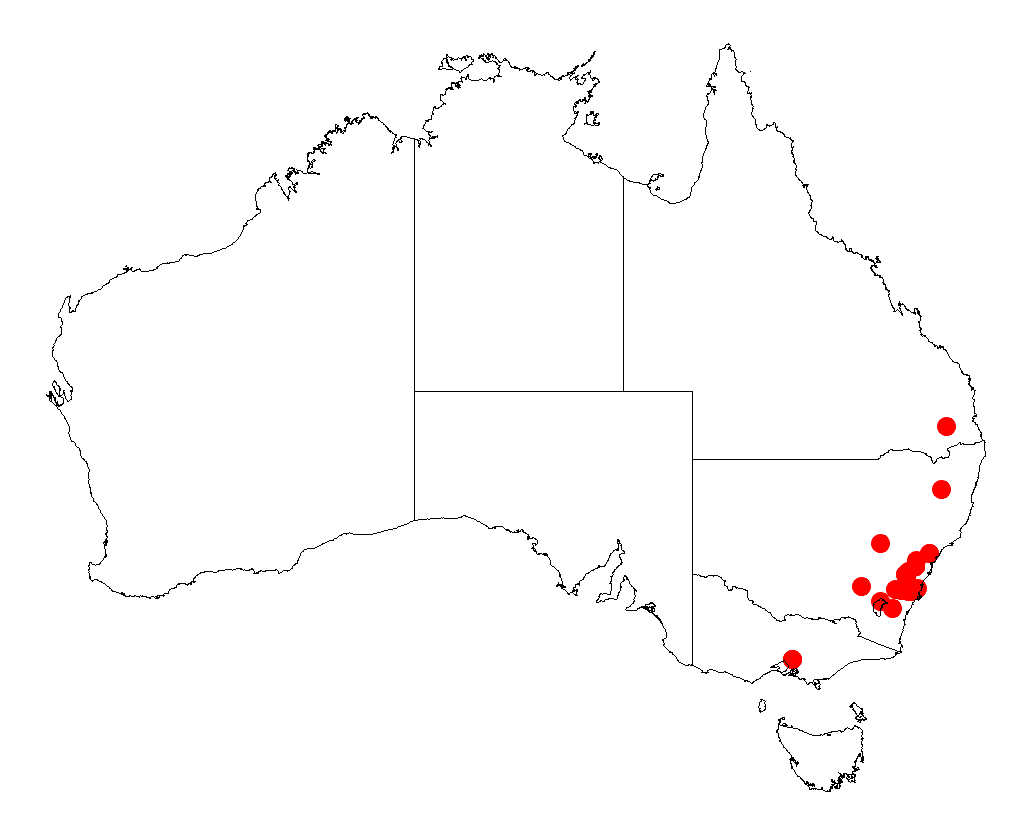
- Occurrence data from AVH

Synonyms
- Racosperma jonesii (F.Muell. & Maiden) Pedley

= Acacia jonesii =

Species of legume

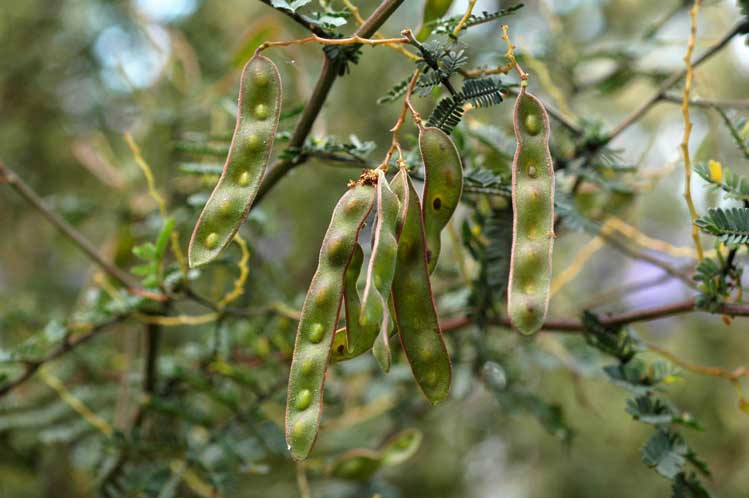
Fruit in Mount Annan Botanic Gardens

Acacia jonesii is a species of flowering plant in the family Fabaceae and is endemic to New South Wales, Australia. It is an erect or spreading, often slender or straggly shrub with bipinnate leaves, heads of yellow flowers in racemes, and thin, black or dark brown pods.

== Description ==
Acacia jonesii is an erect or spreading, often slender or straggling shrub that typically grows to 0.4–4 m (1 ft 4 in – 13 ft 1 in) high, and often reproduces by suckering. It has smooth brown to grey-green often mottled bark, and glabrous, terete branchlets. The leaves are bipinnate, subsessile, with 2–11 pairs of pinnae 5–40 mm (0.20–1.57 in) long and decreasing in size towards the leaf base, each pinna with 4 to 21 pairs of narrowly lance-shaped or narrowly oblong pinnules. The rachis, is 10–55 mm (0.39–2.17 in) long, there are minute glands at the base of all or most pairs of pinnae, and the midvein is closer to the edge of the pinnules. The flowers are mostly borne in racemes of spherical heads in axils on an often zig-zag peduncle 1–6 mm (0.039–0.236 in) long. Each head is 5–8 mm (0.20–0.31 in) in diameter, with 8 to 15 yellow to bright yellow flowers. Flowering occurs from July to October, and the pods are straight to slightly curved, 20–70 mm (0.79–2.76 in) long and 5.5–8 mm (0.22–0.31 in) wide and black or dark brown, straight sided or slightly constricted between some seeds.

== Taxonomy ==
Acacia jonesii was first formally described in 1893 by Ferdinand von Mueller and Joseph Maiden in Proceedings of the Linnean Society of New South Wales from a specimen collected "near Barber's Creek, in the Goulburn District" by Herbert John Rumsey. The specific epithet (jonesii) honours "Dr. Sydney Jones, President of the Australasian Medical Congress at Sydney, whose distinguished reputation is only equalled by his munificence in the cause of medical science."

== Distribution and habitat ==
This species of wattle has a limited distribution on the central and southern coast and tablelands of New South Wales between Bargo, Nowra and Goulburn where it grows in forest and woodland on sandstone and in clay soils.

== See also ==
- List of Acacia species
