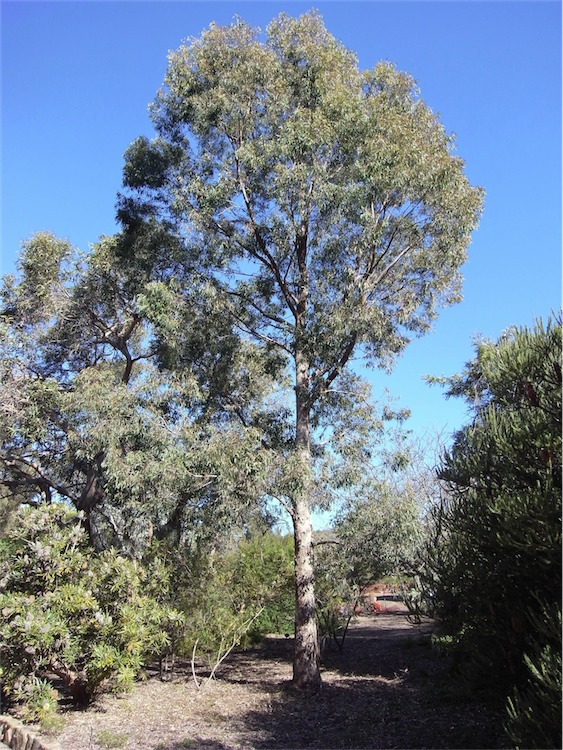
- Eucalyptus rudderi in the ANBG

Scientific classification
- Kingdom: Plantae
- Clade: Embryophytes
- Clade: Tracheophytes
- Clade: Spermatophytes
- Clade: Angiosperms
- Clade: Eudicots
- Clade: Rosids
- Order: Myrtales
- Family: Myrtaceae
- Genus: Eucalyptus
- Species: E. rudderi

Binomial name
- Eucalyptus rudderi Maiden

= Eucalyptus rudderi =

Rudder's box

Species of eucalyptus

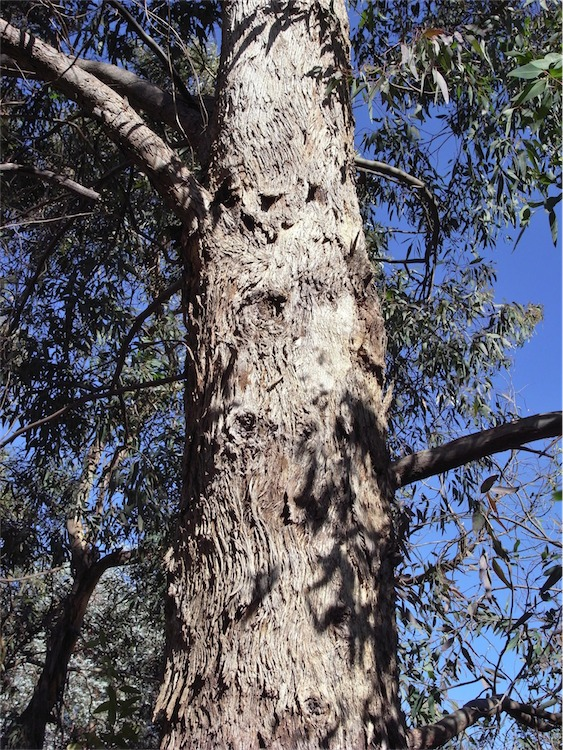
Bark

Eucalyptus rudderi, or Rudder's box, is a species of tree that is endemic to northern New South Wales. It has rough fibrous or flaky bark on the trunk and branches, lance-shaped adult leaves, flower buds in groups of seven, white flowers and barrel-shaped or hemispherical fruit.

== Description ==
Eucalyptus rudderi is a tree that typically grows to a height of 30–40 m (98–131 ft) and forms a lignotuber. It has rough, fibrous or flaky grey bark on the trunk and branches. Young plants and coppice regrowth have stems that are square in cross-section, and narrow lance-shaped, dull green leaves that are 35–50 mm (1.4–2.0 in) long and 5–10 mm (0.20–0.39 in) wide. Adult leaves are the same shade of green on both sides, lance-shaped, 70–130 mm (2.8–5.1 in) long and 12–25 mm (0.47–0.98 in) wide, tapering to a petiole 8–15 mm (0.31–0.59 in) long. The flower buds are arranged on the ends of branchlets in groups of seven on a branched peduncle 5–10 mm (0.20–0.39 in) long, the individual buds on pedicels 3–4 mm (0.12–0.16 in) long. Mature buds are oval, about 3 mm (0.12 in) long and 2–3 mm (0.079–0.118 in) wide with a conical operculum. Flowering occurs from March to April and the flowers are white. The fruit is a woody barrel-shaped or hemispherical capsule 3–4 mm (0.12–0.16 in) long and 4–5 mm (0.16–0.20 in) wide with the valves near rim level.

== Taxonomy and naming ==
Eucalyptus rudderi was first formally described in 1905 by Joseph Maiden in Proceedings of the Linnean Society of New South Wales. The type specimen was collected by Augustus Rudder (1928–1904) at Cundletown. The specific epithet (rudderi) honours the collector of the type material.

== Distribution and habitat ==
Rudder's box grows in shallow soil on steep slopes in forest in the Taree-Karuah area.
