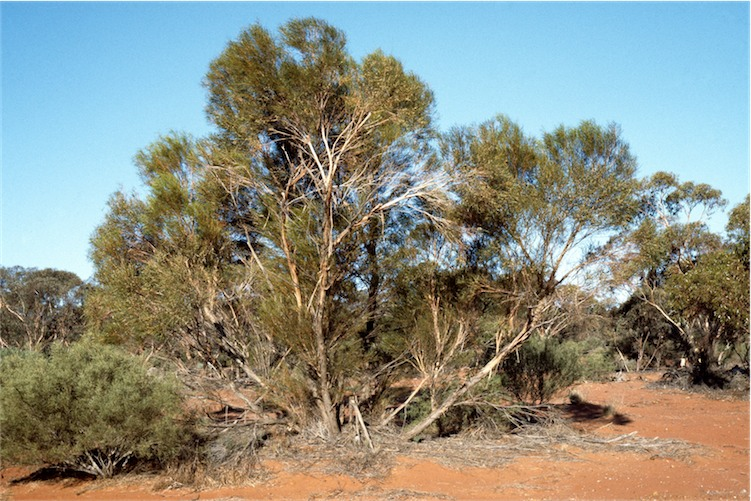
- Eucalyptus jutsonii growing west of Kalgoorlie

Conservation status
- Vulnerable (IUCN 3.1)

Scientific classification
- Kingdom: Plantae
- Clade: Tracheophytes
- Clade: Angiosperms
- Clade: Eudicots
- Clade: Rosids
- Order: Myrtales
- Family: Myrtaceae
- Genus: Eucalyptus
- Species: E. jutsonii

Binomial name
- Eucalyptus jutsonii Maiden

Subspecies
- Eucalyptus jutsonii subsp. jutsonii; Eucalyptus jutsonii subsp. kobela D.Nicolle & M.E.French

= Eucalyptus jutsonii =

Jutson's mallee

Species of eucalyptus

Eucalyptus jutsonii, commonly known as Jutson's mallee, is a species of mallee that is endemic to Western Australia. It has rough, fibrous bark on its stems, smooth pinkish to greyish brown bark above, glossy green, linear adult leaves, flower buds in groups of seven, cream-coloured flowers and shortened spherical fruit.

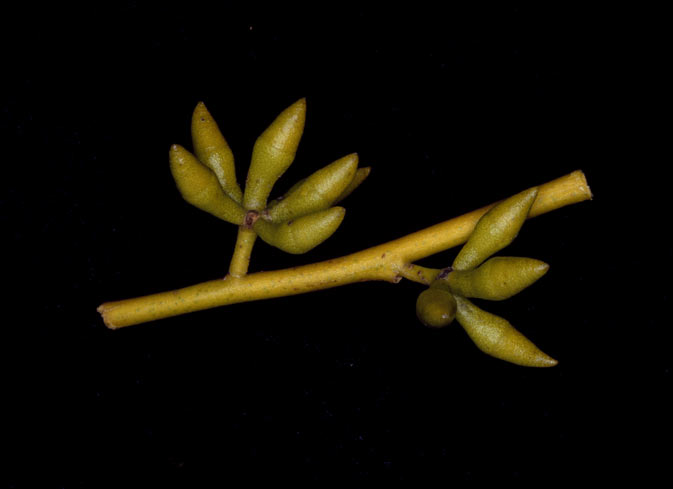
Buds

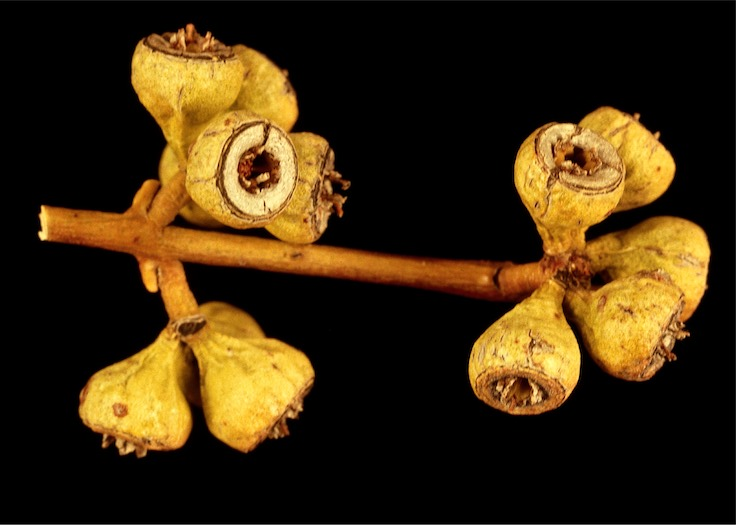
Fruit

== Description ==
Eucalyptus jutsonii is a mallee that typically grows to a height of 4–8 m (13–26 ft) and forms a lignotuber. It has rough, fibrous grey bark on the stems, smooth pinkish to greyish bark above. Young plants and coppice regrowth have sessile, dull greyish green, linear leaves, 60–100 mm (2.4–3.9 in) long and 1–3 mm (0.039–0.118 in) wide. Adult leaves are the same glossy green on both sides, linear in shape, 75–135 mm (3.0–5.3 in) long and 3–6 mm (0.12–0.24 in) wide tapering to a petiole up to 8 mm (0.31 in) long. The flower buds are arranged in leaf axils on an unbranched peduncle 2–7 mm (0.079–0.276 in) long, the individual buds on pedicels 1–3 mm (0.039–0.118 in) long. Mature buds are oval to spindle-shaped, 6–9 mm (0.24–0.35 in) long and 3–4 mm (0.12–0.16 in) wide with a conical operculum. Flowering occurs between November and March and the flowers are cream-coloured or white. The fruit is a woody shortened spherical capsule 4–5 mm (0.16–0.20 in) long and 5–7 mm (0.20–0.28 in) wide with the valves near rim level.

== Taxonomy and naming ==
Eucalyptus jutsonii was first formally described in 1919 by Joseph Maiden from a specimen collected from Comet Vale by John Thomas Jutson and the description was published in Journal and Proceedings of the Royal Society of New South Wales. The specific epithet honours the collector of the type specimen.

In 2007, Dean Nicolle and Malcolm French described two subspecies and the names have been accepted by the Australian Plant Census:

- Eucalyptus jutsonii Maiden subsp. jutsonii has adult leaves that are 3–6 mm (0.12–0.24 in) wide and fruits 4–8 mm (0.16–0.31 in) long;
- Eucalyptus jutsonii subsp. kobela D.Nicolle & M.E.French has adult leaves that are 1–2.5 mm (0.039–0.098 in) wide and fruits 3–5 mm (0.12–0.20 in) long.

== Distribution and habitat ==
Jutson's mallee grows in open shrubland on sand or sandy loam in a restricted area north of Kalgoorlie. Subspecies kobela is only known from two populations east of Morawa.

== Conservation status ==
Subspecies jutsonii is listed as "Priority Four" by the Government of Western Australia Department of Parks and Wildlife, meaning that it is rare or near threatened. Subspecies kobela is classified as "Priority One" by the Government of Western Australia Department of Parks and Wildlife, meaning that it is known from only one or a few locations which are potentially at risk.

== See also ==
- List of Eucalyptus species
