= Eucalyptus praecox =

Brittle gum

Scientific classification
- Kingdom: Plantae
- Clade: Tracheophytes
- Clade: Angiosperms
- Clade: Eudicots
- Clade: Rosids
- Order: Myrtales
- Family: Myrtaceae
- Genus: Eucalyptus
- Species: E. praecox

Binomial name
- Eucalyptus praecox Maiden

Species of eucalyptus

Eucalyptus praecox, or brittle gum, is a tree native to central New South Wales.
