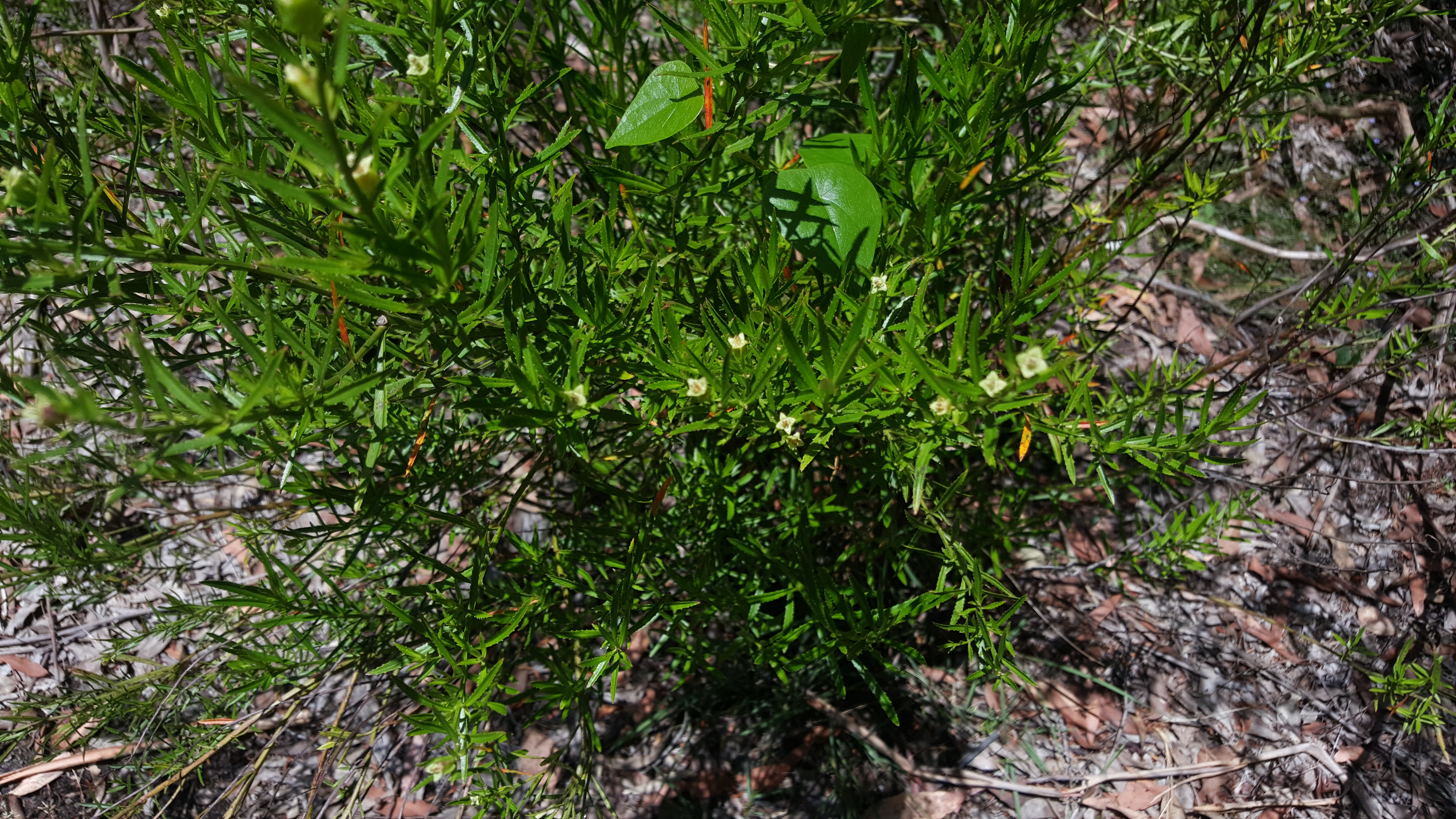

Conservation status
- Endangered (EPBC Act)

Scientific classification
- Kingdom: Plantae
- Clade: Tracheophytes
- Clade: Angiosperms
- Clade: Eudicots
- Order: Saxifragales
- Family: Haloragaceae
- Genus: Haloragodendron
- Species: H. lucasii

Binomial name
- Haloragodendron lucasii (Maiden & Betche) Orchard

Synonyms
- Haloragis lucasii - Maiden & Betche

= Haloragodendron lucasii =

Species of plant

Haloragodendron lucasii is a small plant growing in the Sydney region of eastern Australia. A threatened species, growing on sandstone soils to 1.5 metres tall. Once considered extinct, the species persists in and near Garigal National Park and Ku-ring-gai Chase National Park.
