= Acacia websteri =

Scientific classification
- Kingdom: Plantae
- Clade: Tracheophytes
- Clade: Angiosperms
- Clade: Eudicots
- Clade: Rosids
- Order: Fabales
- Family: Fabaceae
- Subfamily: Caesalpinioideae
- Clade: Mimosoid clade
- Genus: Acacia
- Species: A. websteri

Binomial name
- Acacia websteri Maiden & Blakely
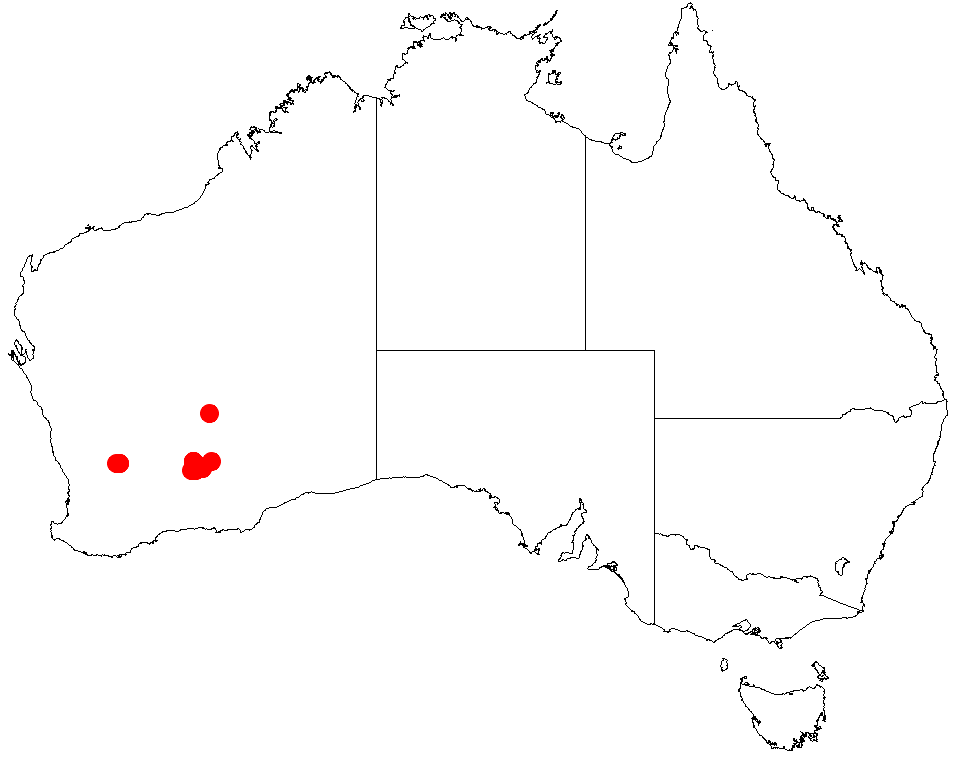
- Occurrence data from AVH

Species of legume

Acacia websteri is a shrub or tree belonging to the genus Acacia and the subgenus Juliflorae that is endemic to western Australia.

== Description ==
The shrub or tree typically grows to a height of 1.2 to 5 metres (4 to 16 ft) and produces yellow flowers. The branchlets flattened near the tips and are sparsely haired to glabrous and occasionally white-resinous. Like most species of Acacia it has phyllodes rather than true leaves. The thinly coriaceous evergreen phyllodes are erect with a linear shape and length of 5 to 12 cm (2.0 to 4.7 in) and a width of 2 to 3.5 mm (0.079 to 0.138 in). They taper to a point with a gently curved apex and have three nerves per face. When the plant blooms it produces simple inflorescences with obloid to sub-spherical flowerheads that have a length of 5 to 6 mm (0.20 to 0.24 in) and a diameter of 4 mm (0.16 in) containing 30 to 36 golden coloured flowers. The narrowly linear seed pods that form after flowering have longitudinal ridges and are straight and biconvex with a length of up to 8 cm (3.1 in) and a width of 2 to 3 mm (0.079 to 0.118 in) containing longitudinally arranged seeds. The light brown seeds have an oblong shape with a length of around 3.5 mm (0.14 in) and a terminal aril.

== Distribution ==
It is native to an area in the Wheatbelt and Goldfields regions of Western Australia. It has a disjunct distribution from around Bencubbin and around the towns of Coolgardie and Kambalda where it is often situated in drainage depressions growing in red loam, sand and clay soils as a part of shrubland and scrub communities.

== See also ==
- List of Acacia species
