= Acacia malloclada =

Scientific classification
- Kingdom: Plantae
- Clade: Tracheophytes
- Clade: Angiosperms
- Clade: Eudicots
- Clade: Rosids
- Order: Fabales
- Family: Fabaceae
- Subfamily: Caesalpinioideae
- Clade: Mimosoid clade
- Genus: Acacia
- Species: A. malloclada

Binomial name
- Acacia malloclada Maiden & Blakely

Synonyms
- Racosperma mallocladum (Maiden & Blakely) Pedley

Species of legume

Acacia malloclada is a species of flowering plant in the family Fabaceae and is endemic to northern Australia. It is a slender shrub with hairy branchlets, narrowly oblong or linear, flat phyllodes, and spikes of yellow flowers.

== Description ==
Acacia malloclada is a slender shrub with angular, moderately to densely covered with shaggy, soft hairs on the branchlets. Its phyllodes are narrowly oblong to linear, flat, straight or slightly sickle-shaped, 40–60 mm (1.6–2.4 in) long, with a stiff, narrow point about 1 mm (0.039 in) long on the end and many stomates. There are six to ten parallel, more or less equally prominent longitudinal veins on the phyllodes and a small oblong or elliptic, slit-like gland just above the pulvinus. The flowers are yellow and borne in a spike about 7–12 mm (0.28–0.47 in) long, but the pods have not been seen.

== Taxonomy ==
Acacia malloclada was first formally described in 1927 by Joseph Maiden and William Blakely in the Journal of the Royal Society of Western Australia from specimens collected in "North Australia".

== Distribution and habitat ==
"The type specimen appears to be the only record of this species and very little information is provided on its location, habit or habitat. Many of the specimens previously identified as Acacia malloclada in Australian herbaria belong to the Acacia hammondi–Acacia sphaerogemma complex, of which it may simply be a variant."

== See also ==
- List of Acacia species
