= Acacia centrinervia =

Hairy white wattle

Scientific classification
- Kingdom: Plantae
- Clade: Tracheophytes
- Clade: Angiosperms
- Clade: Eudicots
- Clade: Rosids
- Order: Fabales
- Family: Fabaceae
- Subfamily: Caesalpinioideae
- Clade: Mimosoid clade
- Genus: Acacia
- Species: A. centrinervia

Binomial name
- Acacia centrinervia Maiden & Blakely

Synonyms
- Racosperma centrinervium (Maiden & Blakely) Pedley

Species of legume

Acacia centrinervia, commonly known as hairy white wattle, is a species of flowering plant in the family Fabaceae and is endemic to eastern Australia. It is an erect or spreading shrub with very narrowly elliptic to narrowly lance-shaped phyllodes with the narrower end towards the base and spherical heads of bright yellow flowers.

== Description ==
Acacia centrinervia is an erect or spreading shrub that typically grows to a height of 0.3 to 1 m (1 ft 0 in to 3 ft 3 in) and has more or less terete branchlets that are sometimes hairy. Its phyllodes are very narrowly elliptic to narrowly lance-shaped with the narrower end towards the base, 15–25 mm (0.59–0.98 in) long and 2–3 mm (0.079–0.118 in) wide with a prominent midvein, a pointed tip and a gland near the base. The flowers are borne in a spherical head in axils on a peduncle 2–4 mm (0.079–0.157 in) long. Each head is about 4 mm (0.16 in) in diameter with about 20 bright yellow flowers. Flowering occurs in spring, but the pods and seeds have not been recorded.

Acacia centrinervia is very closely related to A. lineata.

== Taxonomy ==
Acacia centrinervia was first formally described in 1927 by the botanists Joseph Maiden and William Blakely in the Journal and Proceedings of the Royal Society of New South Wales from specimens collected in Parkes in 1906. This taxon was originally described in 1916 as Acacia lineata in Journal and Proceedings of the Royal Society of New South Wales, but later formally described as A. centrinervia.

== Distribution ==
This species is only known from the type collection near Parkes in New South Wales, and from the Herries Range near Inglewood in southern Queensland.

== See also ==
- List of Acacia species
