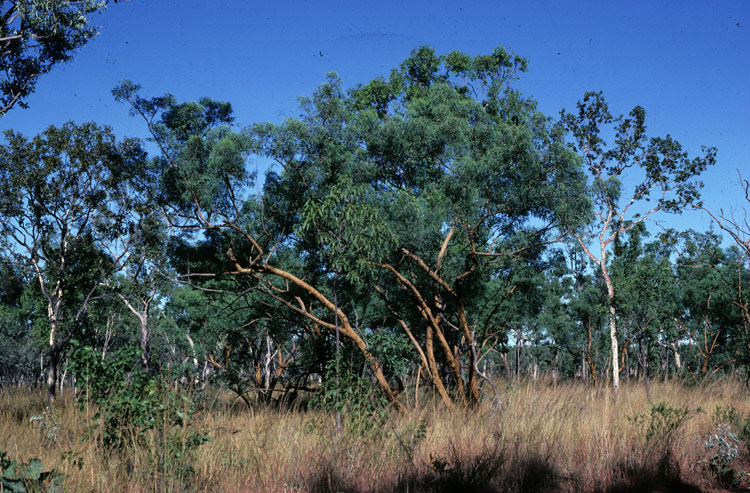
- Eucalyptus lirata at Gibb River Station

Scientific classification
- Kingdom: Plantae
- Clade: Tracheophytes
- Clade: Angiosperms
- Clade: Eudicots
- Clade: Rosids
- Order: Myrtales
- Family: Myrtaceae
- Genus: Eucalyptus
- Species: E. lirata

Binomial name
- Eucalyptus lirata Maiden

= Eucalyptus lirata =

Kimberley yellowjacket

Species of eucalyptus

Eucalyptus lirata, commonly known as Kimberley yellowjacket, is a species of small tree or mallee that is endemic to the Kimberley region of Western Australia. It has rough, fibrous bark on the trunk and most of the branches, lance-shaped or curved adult leaves, flower buds arranged in groups of three, white flowers and cylindrical to cup-shaped fruit.

== Description ==
Eucalyptus lirata is a small tree or mallee that typically grows to a height of 3 to 8 metres (10 to 26 ft) and forms a lignotuber. It has rough, brownish, fibrous or flaky bark on the trunk and most of the branches. Young plants and coppice regrowth have egg-shaped to elliptic leaves that are 45–95 mm (1.8–3.7 in) long, 24–60 mm (0.94–2.36 in) wide. The adult leaves are lance-shaped or curved, the same, or a slightly different shade, of dull bluish or yellowish green on both sides, 65–140 mm (2.6–5.5 in) long and 7–26 mm (0.28–1.02 in) wide, tapering to a petiole 6–20 mm (0.24–0.79 in) long. The flower buds are arranged in leaf axils in groups of three on an unbranched peduncle 5–8 mm (0.20–0.31 in) long, the individual buds on pedicels 1–4 mm (0.039–0.157 in) long. Mature buds are cylindrical, 7–11 mm (0.28–0.43 in) long and 4–5 mm (0.16–0.20 in) wide with a conical to rounded operculum. Flowering occurs from September to January and the flowers are white. The fruit is a woody, cylindrical to cup-shaped capsule 7–11 mm (0.28–0.43 in) long and 5–10 mm (0.20–0.39 in) wide with the valves near rim level.

== Taxonomy and naming ==
Eucalyptus lirata was first formally described in 1921 by Joseph Maiden in his book A Critical Revision of the Genus Eucalyptus. The specific epithet (liratus) is from the Latin word lira meaning "furrowed" with the ending -atus indicating possession, probably referring to the bark.

== Distribution and habitat ==
The Kimberley leatherjacket grows on ridges, rises and plateaux as scattered trees or in woodland in the Kimberley region.

== Conservation status ==
This eucalypt is classified as "not threatened" by the Western Australian Government Department of Parks and Wildlife.

== See also ==
- List of Eucalyptus species
