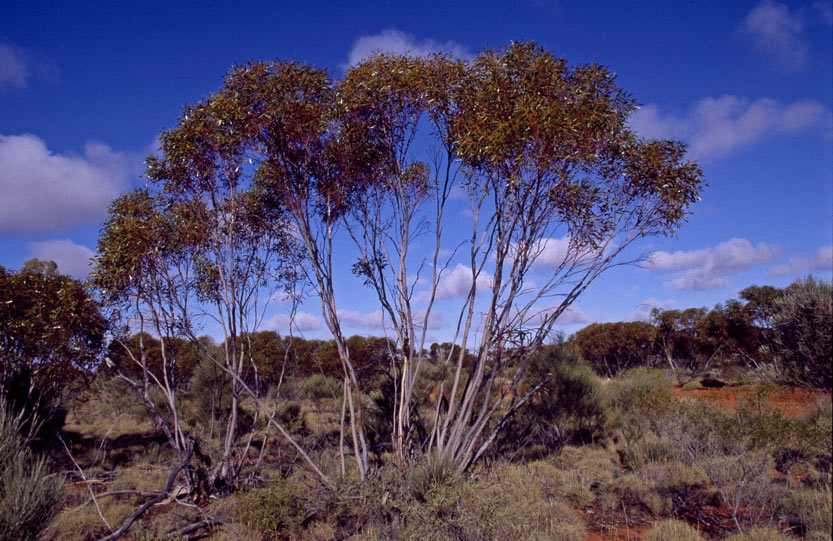
- Eucalyptus rigidula near Laverton

Scientific classification
- Kingdom: Plantae
- Clade: Embryophytes
- Clade: Tracheophytes
- Clade: Spermatophytes
- Clade: Angiosperms
- Clade: Eudicots
- Clade: Rosids
- Order: Myrtales
- Family: Myrtaceae
- Genus: Eucalyptus
- Species: E. rigidula

Binomial name
- Eucalyptus rigidula Maiden

Synonyms
- Eucalyptus angusta Maiden nom. illeg.

= Eucalyptus rigidula =

Stiff-leaved mallee

Species of eucalyptus

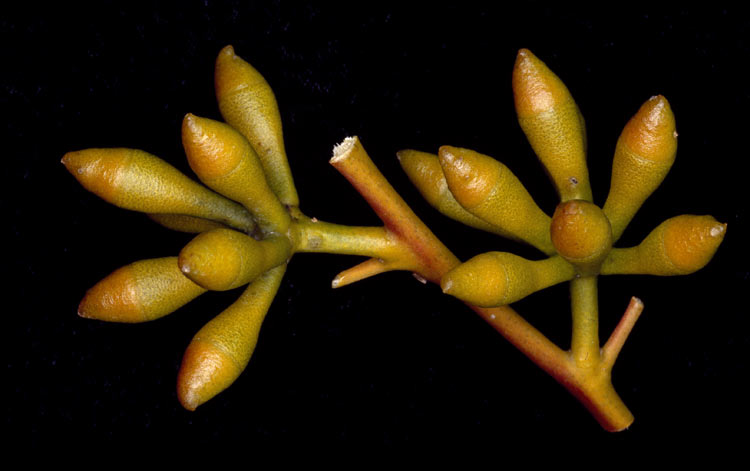
Flower buds

Eucalyptus rigidula, commonly known as stiff-leaved mallee, is a species of mallee that is endemic to Western Australia. It has smooth bark, linear to narrow elliptic or narrow lance-shaped leaves, flower buds in groups of nine or eleven, creamy white flowers and barrel-shaped to hemispherical fruit.

== Description ==
Eucalyptus rigidula is a mallee that typically grows to a height of 1.5–5 m (4 ft 11 in – 16 ft 5 in) and forms a lignotuber. The bark is smooth and white-grey brown in colour, powdery with no pith or bark glands and peels in ribbony strips at the base. Young plants and coppice regrowth have glossy green, linear to narrow lance-shaped or narrow elliptical leaves that are 50–90 mm (2.0–3.5 in) long and 5–10 mm (0.20–0.39 in) wide. Adult leaves are linear to narrow elliptical or narrow lance-shaped, 47–100 mm (1.9–3.9 in) long and 4–17 mm (0.16–0.67 in) wide, tapering to a petiole 5–15 mm (0.20–0.59 in) long. The flower buds are arranged in leaf axils in groups of seven or nine on an unbranched peduncle 2–13 mm (0.079–0.512 in) long, the individual buds on pedicels 1–5 mm (0.039–0.197 in) long. Mature buds are oval to spindle-shaped, 8–12 mm (0.31–0.47 in) long and 3–5 mm (0.12–0.20 in) wide with a conical to beaked operculum. Flowering occurs from December to April and the flowers are creamy white. The fruit is a woody barrel-shaped, shortened spherical or hemispherical capsule 4–8 mm (0.16–0.31 in) long and 5–8 mm (0.20–0.31 in) wide with the valves slightly below the level of the rim.

== Taxonomy ==
Eucalyptus rigidula was first formally described in 1928 by the botanist Joseph Maiden in his book A Critical Revision of the Genus Eucalyptus. The type specimen was collected by Maiden in 1909 from near Comet Vale. The specific epithet (rigidula) is from the Latin word rigidulus referring to the "somewhat rigid leaves".

== Distribution ==
The stiff-leaved mallee is found in heath and shrubland between the lower Murchidon River, Grass Patch and the western edge of the Great Victoria Desert, growing in yellow or red sandy soils.

== Conservation status ==
This eucalypt is classified as "not threatened" by the Western Australian Government Department of Parks and Wildlife.

== See also ==
- List of Eucalyptus species
