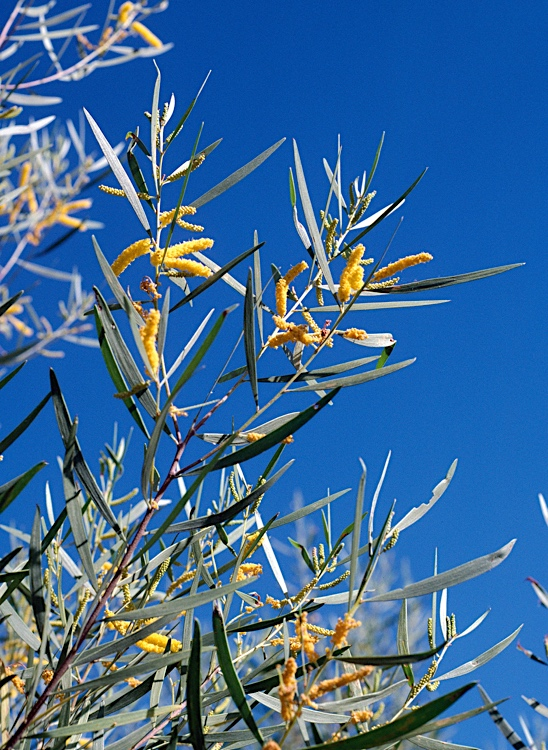

Scientific classification
- Kingdom: Plantae
- Clade: Tracheophytes
- Clade: Angiosperms
- Clade: Eudicots
- Clade: Rosids
- Order: Fabales
- Family: Fabaceae
- Subfamily: Caesalpinioideae
- Clade: Mimosoid clade
- Genus: Acacia
- Species: A. hammondii

Binomial name
- Acacia hammondii Maiden
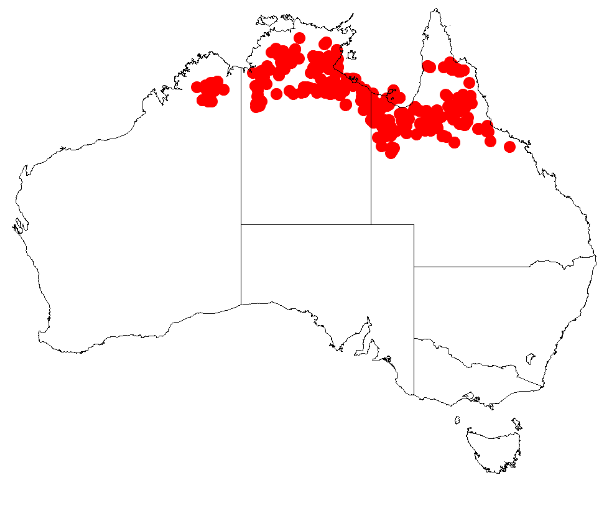
- Occurrence data from AVH

Synonyms
- Acacia hammondi Maiden orth. var.; Acacia sphaerogemma Maiden & Blakely; Racosperma hammondii (Maiden) Pedley; Acacia plectocarpa auct. non A.Cunn. ex Benth.: Mueller, F.J.H. von (1887)

= Acacia hammondii =

Hammond's wattle

Species of legume

Acacia hammondii, also known as Hammond's wattle, is a species of flowering plant in the family Fabaceae and is endemic to northern Australia. It is a shrub or tree with linear or very narrowly elliptic phyllodes, spikes of yellow flowers and papery, shiny, narrowly oblong pods.

== Description ==
Acacia hammondii is a tree or shrub that typically grows to a height of 2.5–5 m (8 ft 2 in – 16 ft 5 in) and has smooth or fibrous and fissured bark. Its branchlets are angular, resinous, glabrous or covered with soft hairs, and has prominent lenticels. Its phyllodes are linear or very narrowly elliptic, flat, straight or slightly sickle-shaped, 25–85 mm (0.98–3.35 in) long, 3–7.5 mm (0.12–0.30 in) wide, thinly leathery with two conspicuous main veins, many stomates and a gland up to 0.5 mm (0.020 in) above the pulvinus. The flowers are yellow, borne in cylindrical spikes 17–25 mm (0.67–0.98 in) long and 4–5 mm (0.16–0.20 in) wide on a peduncle 3–5 mm (0.12–0.20 in) long. Flowering occurs from February to August and the pods are papery, shiny and knife-like to oblong, 37–60 mm (1.5–2.4 in) long, 5–8 mm (0.20–0.31 in) wide and glabrous.

== Taxonomy ==
Acacia hammondii was first formally described in 1917 by Joseph Maiden in the Journal and Proceedings of the Royal Society of New South Wales from specimens collected on the Lower Victoria River by Ferdinand von Mueller. The specific epithet (hammondii) honours Maiden's only son, Harrie Hammond Maiden, "who for years before his untimely death, was my companion in the bush, and an assiduous observer and collector of plants".

== Distribution ==
Hammond's wattle grows in tropical parts of northern Australia in Western Australia, the Northern Territory and Queensland between 13º30'S and 20ºS. It is found as far west as the Kimberley region of Western Australia and is fairly common in coastal and subcoastal areas around the lower part of the Gulf of Carpentaria including the offshore islands. It is far less common in western inland parts of the Northern Territory and eastern parts of Queensland. It grows well in sand, sandy loam, clay and stony lateritic soils in open Eucalyptus woodland communities, often with grassy understorey.

== Conservation status ==
Acacia hammondii is listed as "not threatened" by the Government of Western Australia Department of Biodiversity, Conservation and Attractions, and as of "least concern" under the Northern Territory Government Territory Park and Wildlife Conservation Act.

== See also ==
- List of Acacia species
