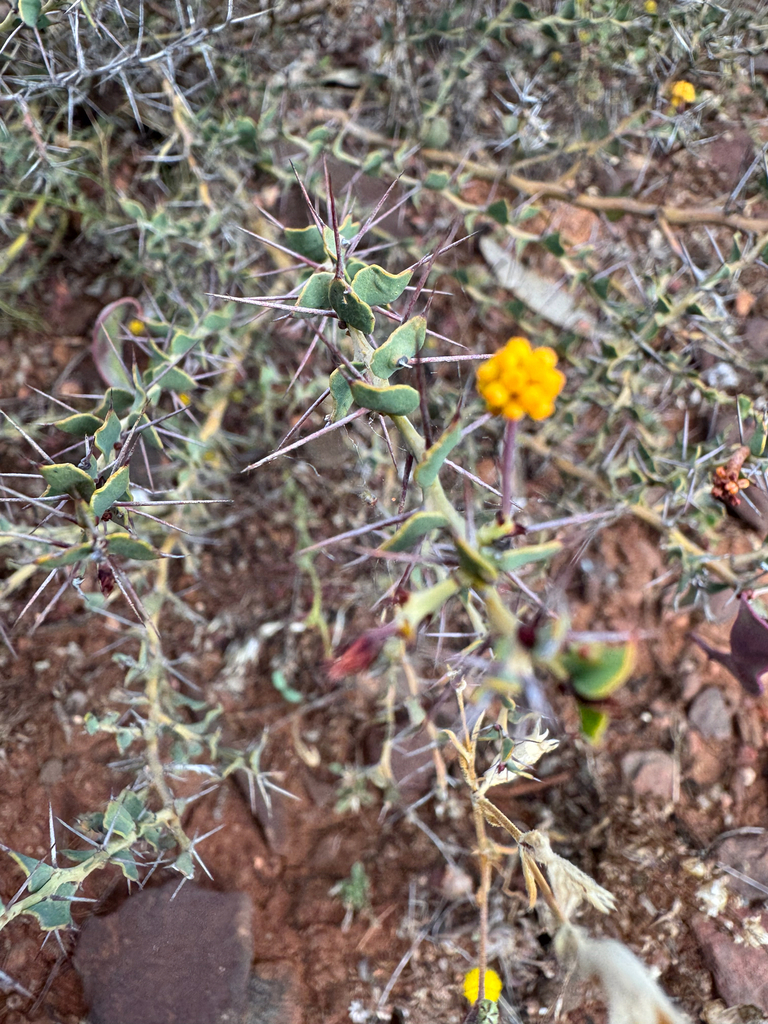
- Near Marvel Loch

Scientific classification
- Kingdom: Plantae
- Clade: Embryophytes
- Clade: Tracheophytes
- Clade: Spermatophytes
- Clade: Angiosperms
- Clade: Eudicots
- Clade: Rosids
- Order: Fabales
- Family: Fabaceae
- Subfamily: Caesalpinioideae
- Clade: Mimosoid clade
- Genus: Acacia
- Species: A. rendlei

Binomial name
- Acacia rendlei Maiden
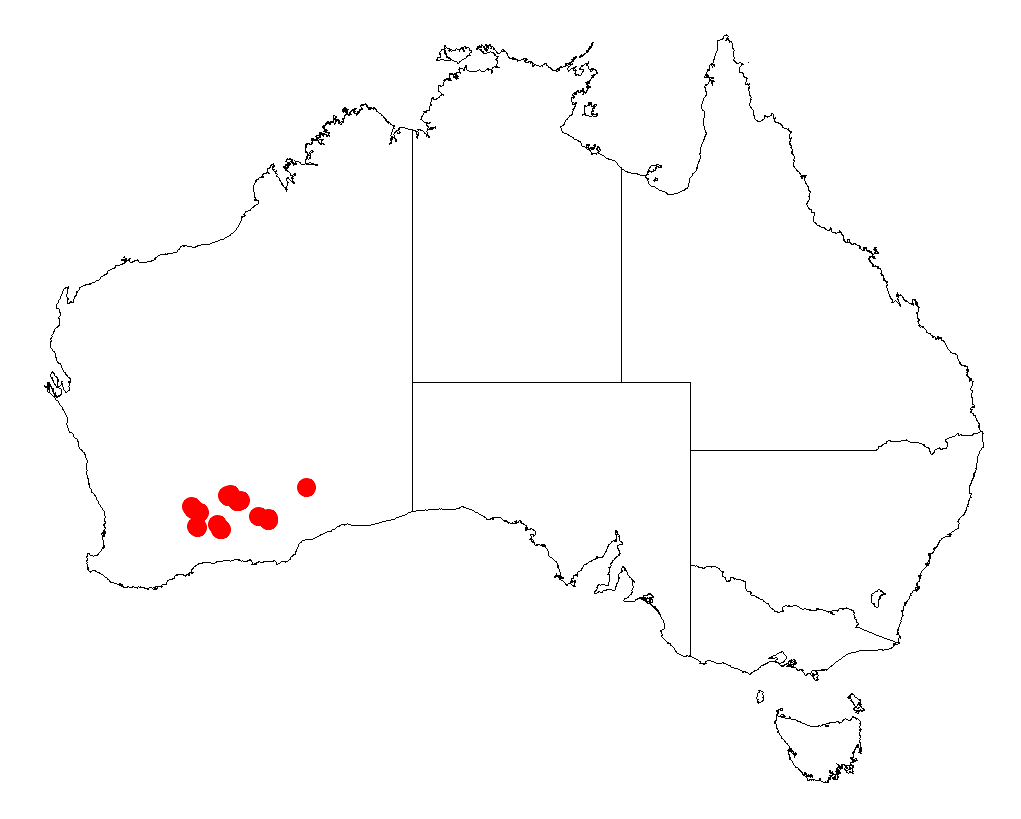
- Occurrence data from AVH

= Acacia rendlei =

Species of legume

Acacia rendlei is a shrub of the genus Acacia and the subgenus Phyllodineae that is endemic to south western Australia.

== Description ==
The dense, spreading and pungent shrub typically grows to a height of 0.3 to 1.1 metres (1.0 to 3.6 ft) with an intricate habit. It has glabrous branchlets with spinose stipules that are 6 to 17 mm (0.24 to 0.67 in) in length and widely spreading. Like most species of Acacia it has phyllodes rather than true leaves. The pungent, evergreen and dimidiate phyllodes have a length of 6.5 to 10 mm (0.26 to 0.39 in) and a width of 4.5 to 7.5 mm (0.18 to 0.30 in) with a midrib that is not prominent. It blooms from October to December and produces yellow flowers. The simple inflorescences occur singly or in pairs in the axils and have spherical flower-heads containing 26 to 32 golden coloured flowers. Following flowering firmly chartaceous seed pods form that have a narrowly oblong shape with a length of up to 45 mm (1.8 in) and awidth of 6.5 to 8 mm (0.26 to 0.31 in). The elliptic shaped seeds have a length of about 4.5 mm (0.18 in) and a linear aril that curves around the base of the seed.

== Distribution ==
It is native to an area in the Wheatbelt and Goldfields-Esperance regions of Western Australia where it is often situated on flats and low hills growing in rocky calcareous loamy or sandy soils. It has a scattered distribution from around the Parker Range in the west to around Kanandah Station in the east where it is often found as a part of open Eucalyptus woodland communities.

== See also ==
- List of Acacia species
