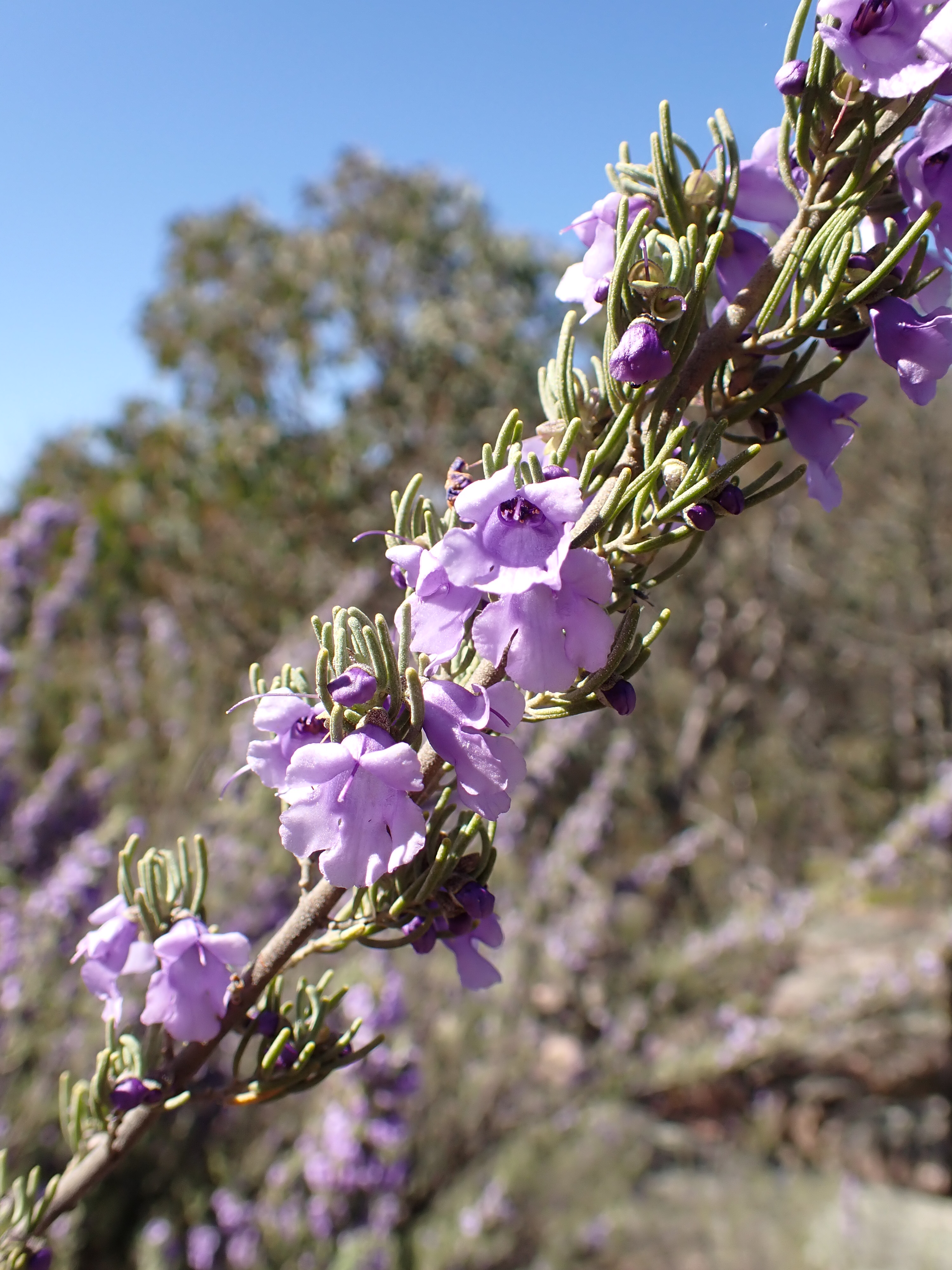

Scientific classification
- Kingdom: Plantae
- Clade: Tracheophytes
- Clade: Angiosperms
- Clade: Eudicots
- Clade: Asterids
- Order: Lamiales
- Family: Lamiaceae
- Genus: Prostanthera
- Species: P. teretifolia

Binomial name
- Prostanthera teretifolia Maiden & Betche
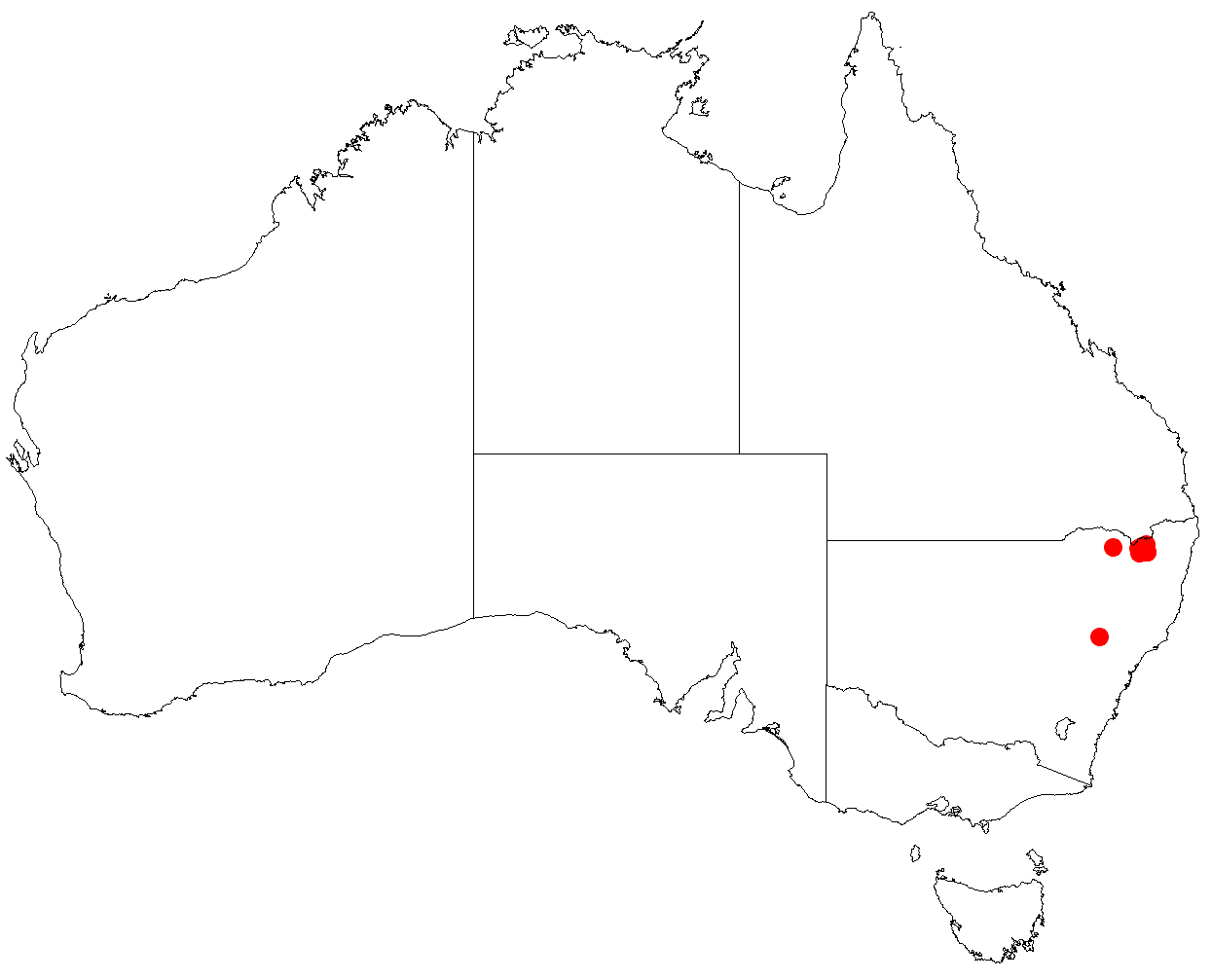
- Occurrence data from AVH

= Prostanthera teretifolia =

Turpentine bush

Species of flowering plant

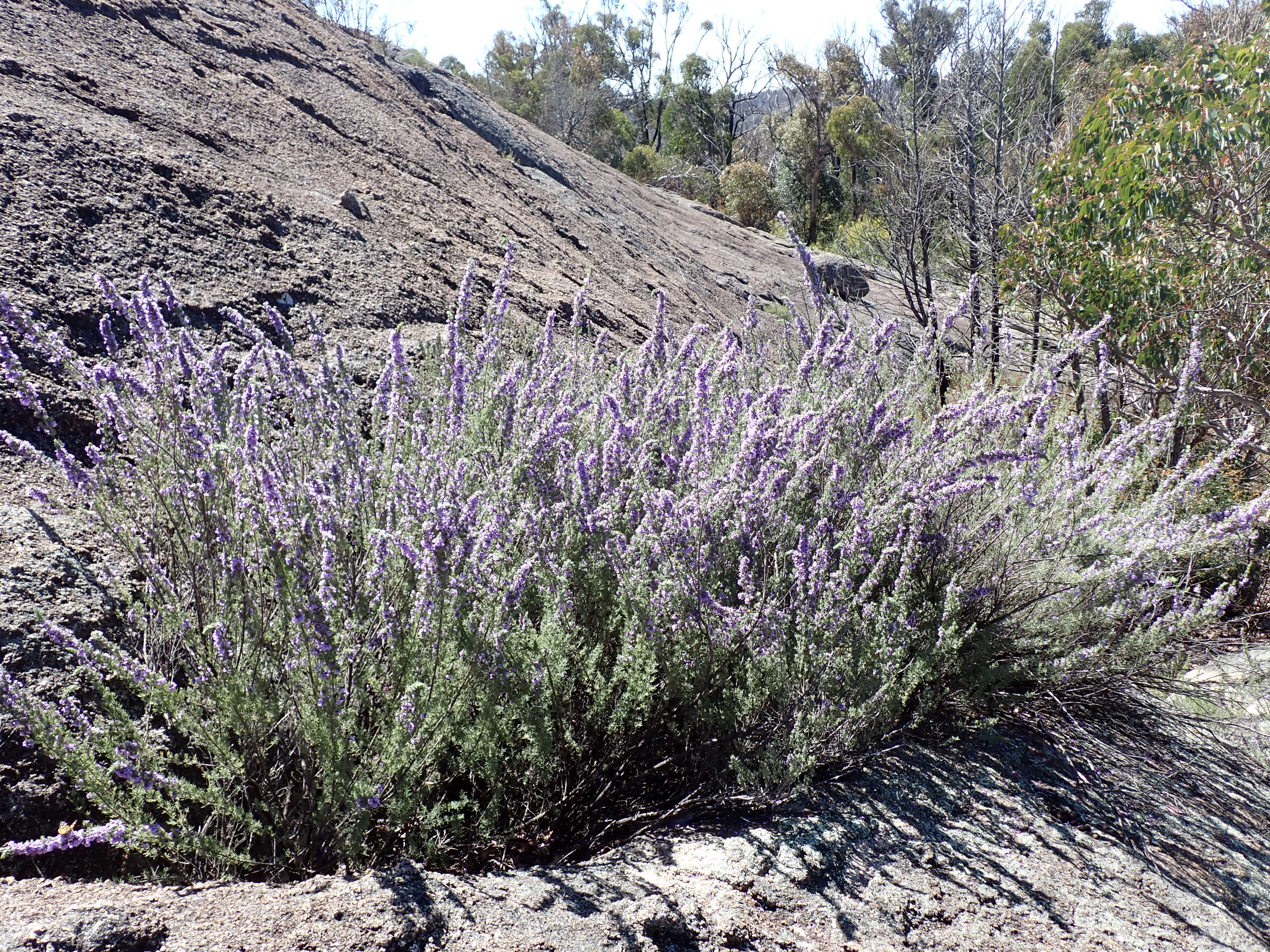
Habit in the Torrington State Conservation Area

Prostanthera teretifolia, commonly known as turpentine bush, is a species of flowering plant in the family Lamiaceae and is endemic to a restricted area of New South Wales. It is an erect to spreading, aromatic shrub with more or less cylindrical leaves and bluish-purple flowers.

== Description ==
Prostanthera teretifolia is an erect to spreading, aromatic shrub that typically grows to a height of 0.3–1 m (1 ft 0 in – 3 ft 3 in) with branches that are densely hairy and glandular. The leaves are greyish green, more or less cylindrical, 5–16 mm (0.20–0.63 in) long and 0.5–0.9 mm (0.020–0.035 in) wide, sometimes with two or three lobes, on a petiole 0.6–1.8 mm (0.024–0.071 in) long. The flowers are arranged in groups on the ends of leafy branchlets, the sepals about 4 mm (0.16 in) long forming a tube 2–2.5 mm (0.079–0.098 in) wide with two lobes, the upper lobe 1.5–2 mm (0.059–0.079 in) long. The petals are bluish-purple, 8–9 mm (0.31–0.35 in) long forming a tube 4.5–5 mm (0.18–0.20 in) long. Flowering usually occurs from August to December.

== Taxonomy ==
Prostanthera teretifolia was first formally described in 1908 by Joseph Maiden and Ernst Betche in the Proceedings of the Linnean Society of New South Wales.

== Distribution and habitat ==
Turpentine bush grows in open and exposed areas amongst granite outcrops near Torrington on the Northern Tablelands of New South Wales.
