= Swainsona bracteata =

Scientific classification
- Kingdom: Plantae
- Clade: Tracheophytes
- Clade: Angiosperms
- Clade: Eudicots
- Clade: Rosids
- Order: Fabales
- Family: Fabaceae
- Subfamily: Faboideae
- Genus: Swainsona
- Species: S. bracteata

Binomial name
- Swainsona bracteata (Maiden and Betche) Joy Thomps.

Synonyms
- Swainsona greyana subsp. bracteata (Maiden & Betche) A.T.Lee; Swainsona greyana var. bracteata Maiden & Betche

Species of plant

Swainsona bracteata is a species of flowering plant in the family Fabaceae and is endemic to eastern Australia. It is a perennial herb with imparipinnate leaves usually with 19 to 25 narrowly egg-shaped leaflets, and racemes of about 20 white, pale pink or pale purple flowers.

== Description ==
Swainsona bracteata is a perennial herb, that typically grows to a height about 1 m (3 ft 3 in) with hairy stems. Its leaves are imparipinnate, 5–10 mm (0.20–0.39 in) long with stipules 2–5 mm (0.079–0.197 in) long at the base. There are mostly 19 to 25 narrowly egg-shaped leaflets, the lower leaflets about 15 mm (0.59 in) and 5–17 mm (0.20–0.67 in) wide. The flowers are arranged in racemes 10–20 mm (0.39–0.79 in) long of about 20, each flower 10–20 mm (0.39–0.79 in) long. The sepals are softly-hairy and joined at the base, forming a tube with the sepal lobes about equal to the sepal tube. The petals are white, pale pink or pale purple. The fruit is an elliptic pod usually 40–50 mm (1.6–2.0 in) long with the remains of the style about 4 mm (0.16 in) long.

== Taxonomy and naming ==
This species was first formally described in 1904 by Joseph Maiden and Ernst Betche who gave it the name Swainsona greyana var. bracteata in the Proceedings of the Linnean Society of New South Wales. In 1990, Joy Thompson raised the variety to species status as Swainsona bracteata in the journal Telopea.

== Distribution and habitat ==
Swainsona bracteata grows in sandy soils in woodland and is widespread in the western slopes and plains of northern New South Wales, from near Condobolin to south-east Queensland.
