= Acacia ferocior =

Scientific classification
- Kingdom: Plantae
- Clade: Tracheophytes
- Clade: Angiosperms
- Clade: Eudicots
- Clade: Rosids
- Order: Fabales
- Family: Fabaceae
- Subfamily: Caesalpinioideae
- Clade: Mimosoid clade
- Genus: Acacia
- Species: A. ferocior

Binomial name
- Acacia ferocior Maiden
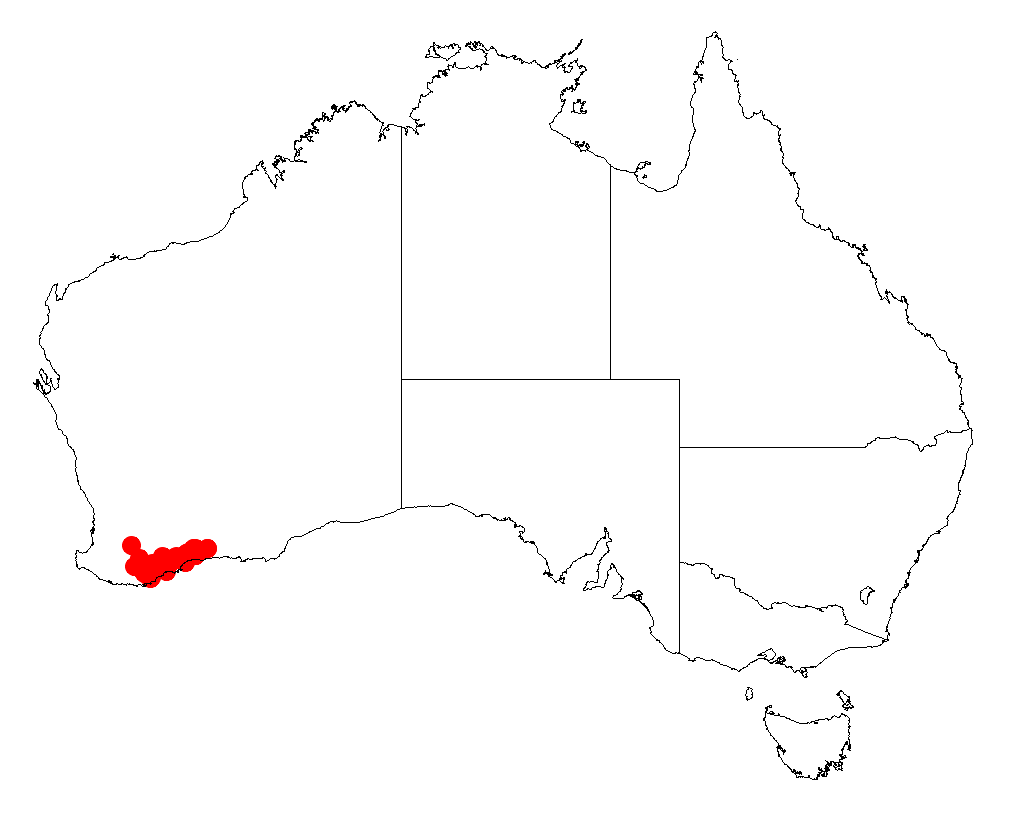
- Occurrence data from AVH

Synonyms
- Racosperma ferocius (Maiden) Pedley; Acacia spinosissima auct. non Benth.: Diels, F.L.E. & Pritzel, E.G. (6 December 1904)

Species of legume

Habit near Ravensthorpe

Acacia ferocior is a species of flowering plant in the family Fabaceae and is endemic to the south coast of Western Australia. It is a rigid, semi-prostrate to erect, compact or spreading shrub with short, spiny branchlets, linear to lance-shaped phyllodes, spherical heads of lemon yellow or golden yellow flowers and strongly curved to coiled, firmly papery pods.

== Description ==
Acacia ferocior is a rigid, semi-prostrate to erect, compact or spreading shrub that typically grows to 0.7 m (2 ft 4 in) high and 2 m (6 ft 7 in) wide and has short, straight, spiny, more or less striated glabrous branchlets. The phyllodes are linear to asymmetrical lance-shaped with the narrower end towards the base, 5–13 mm (0.20–0.51 in) long, 1–2.5 mm (0.039–0.098 in) wide with an excentrically pointed end. The flowers are borne in a spherical head in axils on a slender, glabrous peduncle 4–7 mm (0.16–0.28 in) long, the heads 2.5–3.0 mm (0.098–0.118 in) in diameter, with six to nine lemon yellow or golden yellow flowers. Flowering occurs from August to October, and the pods are strongly curved to coiled, about 10 mm (0.39 in) long, 3 mm (0.12 in) wide, glabrous and firmly papery. The seeds are egg-shaped, about 3 mm (0.12 in) long, semi-shiny and black with a linear to club-shaped aril.

== Taxonomy ==
Acacia ferocior was first formally described in 1920 by Joseph Maiden in the Journal and Proceedings of the Royal Society of New South Wales, from specimens collected by Ernst Pritzel. The specific epithet (ferocior) means 'more fierce' or 'defiant', referring to the spiny branches and phyllodes.

== Distribution and habitat ==
This species of wattle grows in loam, sandy loam or clay in mallee scrub from near Wagin to south of the Stirling Range at Kamballup and east to near the Oldfield River, about 56 km (35 mi) east-north-east of Ravensthorpe, in the Avon Wheatbelt, Esperance Plains, Jarrah Forest and Mallee bioregions in the south of Western Australia.

== Conservation status ==
Acacia ferocior is listed as 'Not threatened' by the Government of Western Australia Department of Biodiversity, Conservation and Attractions.

== See also ==
- List of Acacia species
