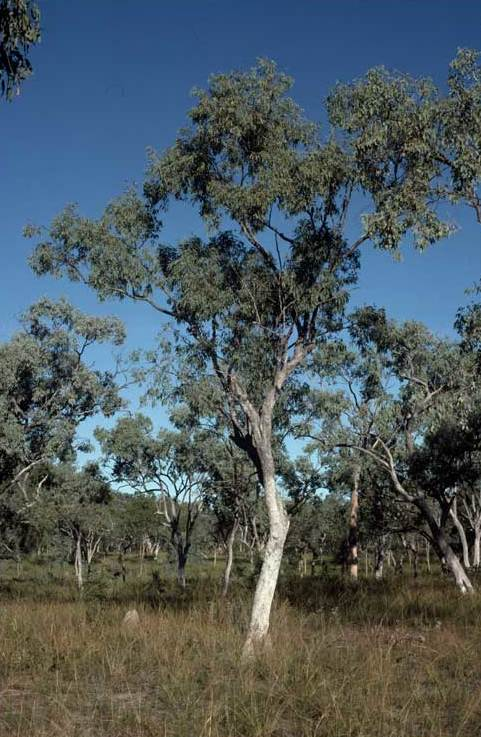

Scientific classification
- Kingdom: Plantae
- Clade: Tracheophytes
- Clade: Angiosperms
- Clade: Eudicots
- Clade: Rosids
- Order: Myrtales
- Family: Myrtaceae
- Genus: Eucalyptus
- Species: E. microneura

Binomial name
- Eucalyptus microneura Maiden & Blakely

= Eucalyptus microneura =

Gilbert River box

Species of eucalyptus

Eucalyptus microneura, commonly known as Gilbert River box, is a species of small to medium-sized tree that is endemic to Queensland. It has rough, fibrous or flaky bark on the trunk and branches, lance-shaped adult leaves, flowers in groups of seven on a branching peduncle, white flowers and conical fruit.

== Description ==
Eucalyptus microneura is a tree that typically grows to a height of 10–18 m (33–59 ft) and forms a lignotuber. It has rough, fissured, fibrous or flaky, greyish brown bark on the trunk and branches. Young plants and coppice regrowth have dull greyish, bluish or glaucous, lance-shaped leaves. Adult leaves are a similar colour to the juvenile leaves, more or less the same colour on both sides, lance-shaped, 50–110 mm (2.0–4.3 in) long and 16–30 mm (0.63–1.18 in) wide on a petiole 13–30 mm (0.51–1.18 in) long. The flower buds are arranged on a branched peduncle, usually in groups of seven, the peduncle 5–13 mm (0.20–0.51 in) long, the individual buds on pedicels 2–6 mm (0.079–0.236 in) long. Mature buds are oval, 6–8 mm (0.24–0.31 in) long and about 4 mm (0.16 in) wide with a conical to rounded or beaked operculum. Flowering has been recorded in January and February and the flowers are white. The fruit is a woody, conical capsule 4–7 mm (0.16–0.28 in) long and wide with the valves near rim level.

== Taxonomy and naming ==
Eucalyptus microneura was first formally described in 1925 by Joseph Maiden and William Blakely and the description was published in Journal and Proceedings of the Royal Society of New South Wales from specimens collected by Cyril Tenison White. The specific epithet (microneura) is from the ancient Greek micro- meaning "little" or "small" and neuron meaning nerve, possibly referring to the inconspicuous leaf veins.

== Distribution and habitat ==
Gilbert River box grows in forest and woodland, usually on river flats, and is found on Cape York Peninsula as far south as Rainscourt Station, near Richmond.

== Conservation status ==
This eucalypt is classified as "least concern" by the Queensland Government Department of Environment and Science.

== See also ==
- List of Eucalyptus species
