= Acacia inops =

Conservation status
- Priority Three — Poorly Known Taxa (DEC)

Scientific classification
- Kingdom: Plantae
- Clade: Embryophytes
- Clade: Tracheophytes
- Clade: Spermatophytes
- Clade: Angiosperms
- Clade: Eudicots
- Clade: Rosids
- Order: Fabales
- Family: Fabaceae
- Subfamily: Caesalpinioideae
- Clade: Mimosoid clade
- Genus: Acacia
- Species: A. inops

Binomial name
- Acacia inops Maiden and Blakely

Synonyms
- Racosperma inops (Maiden & Blakely) Pedley

Species of legume

Acacia inops is a species of flowering plant in the family Fabaceae and is endemic to a restricted part of the south-west of Western Australia. It is a scrambling shrub with weak, thread-like branches, more or less sessile narrowly triangular, sharply pointed phyllodes, and spherical heads of cream-coloured to white flowers.

== Description ==
Acacia inops is a weak, scrambling shrub that typically grows to a height of 0.4–1.1 m (1 ft 4 in – 3 ft 7 in) and has thread-like branches, its branchlets usually glabrous and green. The phyllodes are more or less sessile, narrowly triangular and turned downwards, 5–7 mm (0.20–0.28 in) long and 0.5–1 mm (0.020–0.039 in) wide, sharply pointed and glabrous. There are stipules 1–2 mm (0.039–0.079 in) long and a gland on a short, blunt spur at the base of the phyllode, and a central midvein. The flowers are borne in a spherical head in axils on a slender peduncle 3–5 mm (0.12–0.20 in) long, each head with five to nine cream-coloured to white flowers.

== Taxonomy ==
Acacia inops was first formally described in 1928 by the botanists Joseph Maiden and William Blakely in the Journal of the Royal Society of Western Australia. The specific epithet (inops) means 'poor' or 'weak'.

== Distribution and habitat ==
This species of wattle grows in and around swamps and creek-lines in black peaty sand or clay and is restricted to areas around Margaret River in the Jarrah Forest and Warren bioregions of south-western Western Australia.

== Conservation status ==
Acacia inops is listed as "Priority Three" by the Government of Western Australia Department of Parks and Wildlife, meaning that it is poorly known and known from only a few locations but is not under imminent threat.

== See also ==
- List of Acacia species
