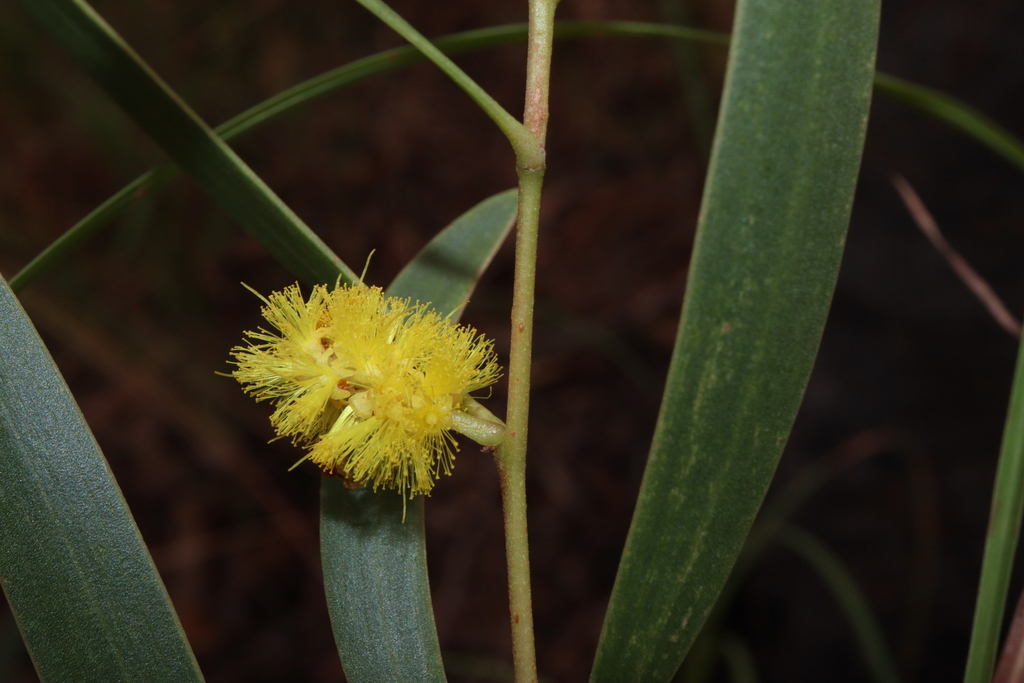
- Near Davies Creek Falls

Scientific classification
- Kingdom: Plantae
- Clade: Embryophytes
- Clade: Tracheophytes
- Clade: Spermatophytes
- Clade: Angiosperms
- Clade: Eudicots
- Clade: Rosids
- Order: Fabales
- Family: Fabaceae
- Subfamily: Caesalpinioideae
- Clade: Mimosoid clade
- Genus: Acacia
- Species: A. whitei

Binomial name
- Acacia whitei Maiden
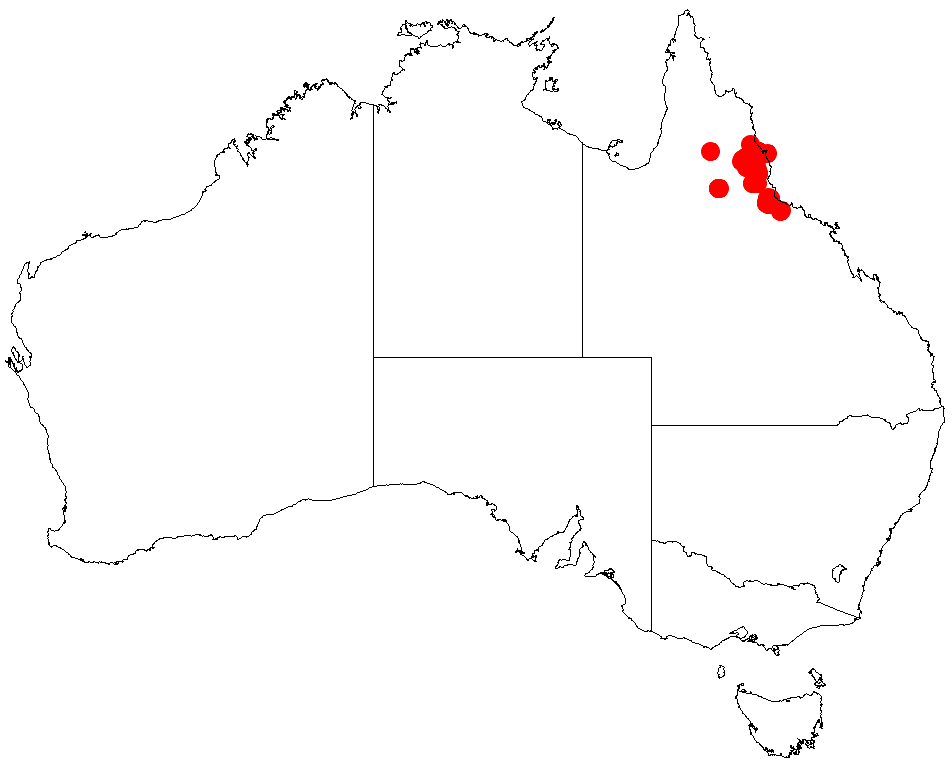
- Occurrence data from AVH

Synonyms
- Racosperma whitei (Maiden) Pedley

= Acacia whitei =

Species of legume

Acacia whitei is a species of wattle native to north Queensland.

== Taxonomy and naming ==
A. whitei was first described by Joseph Maiden in 1918. The specific epithet, whitei, was given to honour the botanist Cyril Tenison White, who communicated the type specimen (from Stannary Hills) to Maiden.
