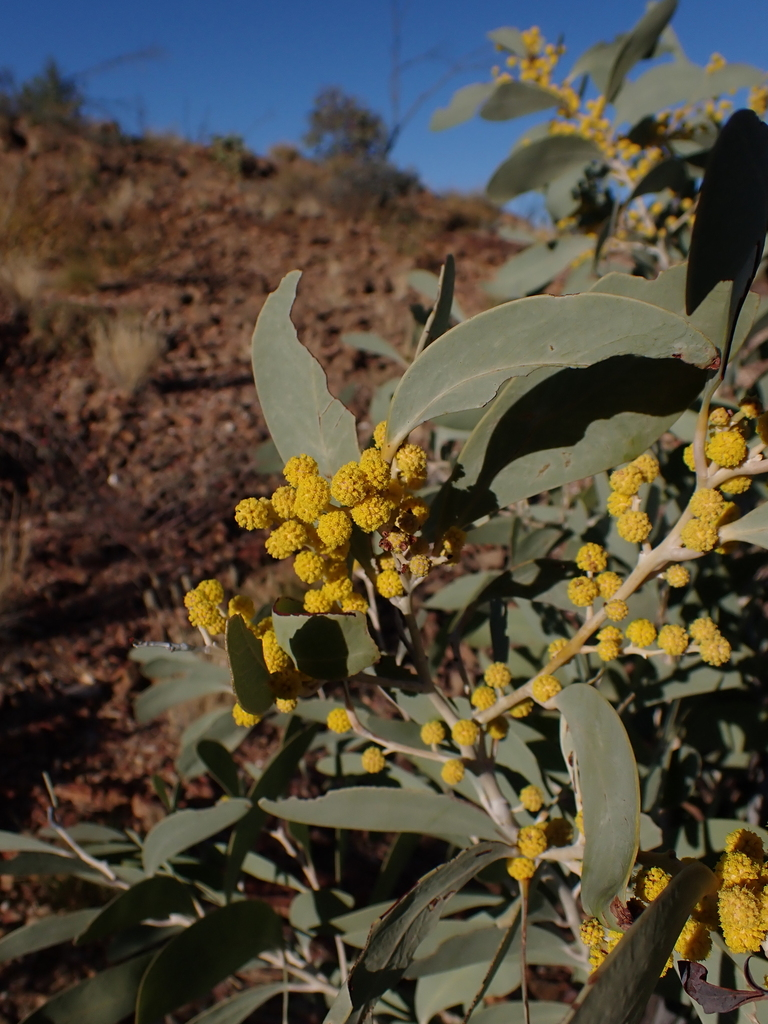
- Near Mount Zeil

Scientific classification
- Kingdom: Plantae
- Clade: Embryophytes
- Clade: Tracheophytes
- Clade: Spermatophytes
- Clade: Angiosperms
- Clade: Eudicots
- Clade: Rosids
- Order: Fabales
- Family: Fabaceae
- Subfamily: Caesalpinioideae
- Clade: Mimosoid clade
- Genus: Acacia
- Species: A. validinervia

Binomial name
- Acacia validinervia Maiden & Blakely
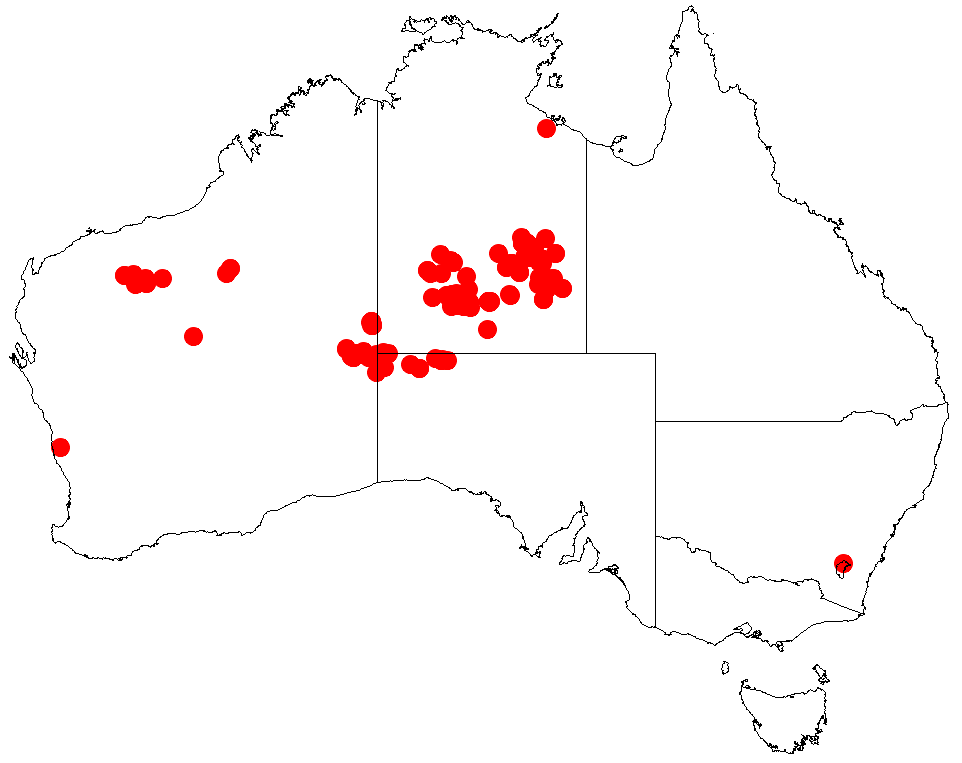
- Occurrence data from AVH

= Acacia validinervia =

Blue wattle

Species of plant

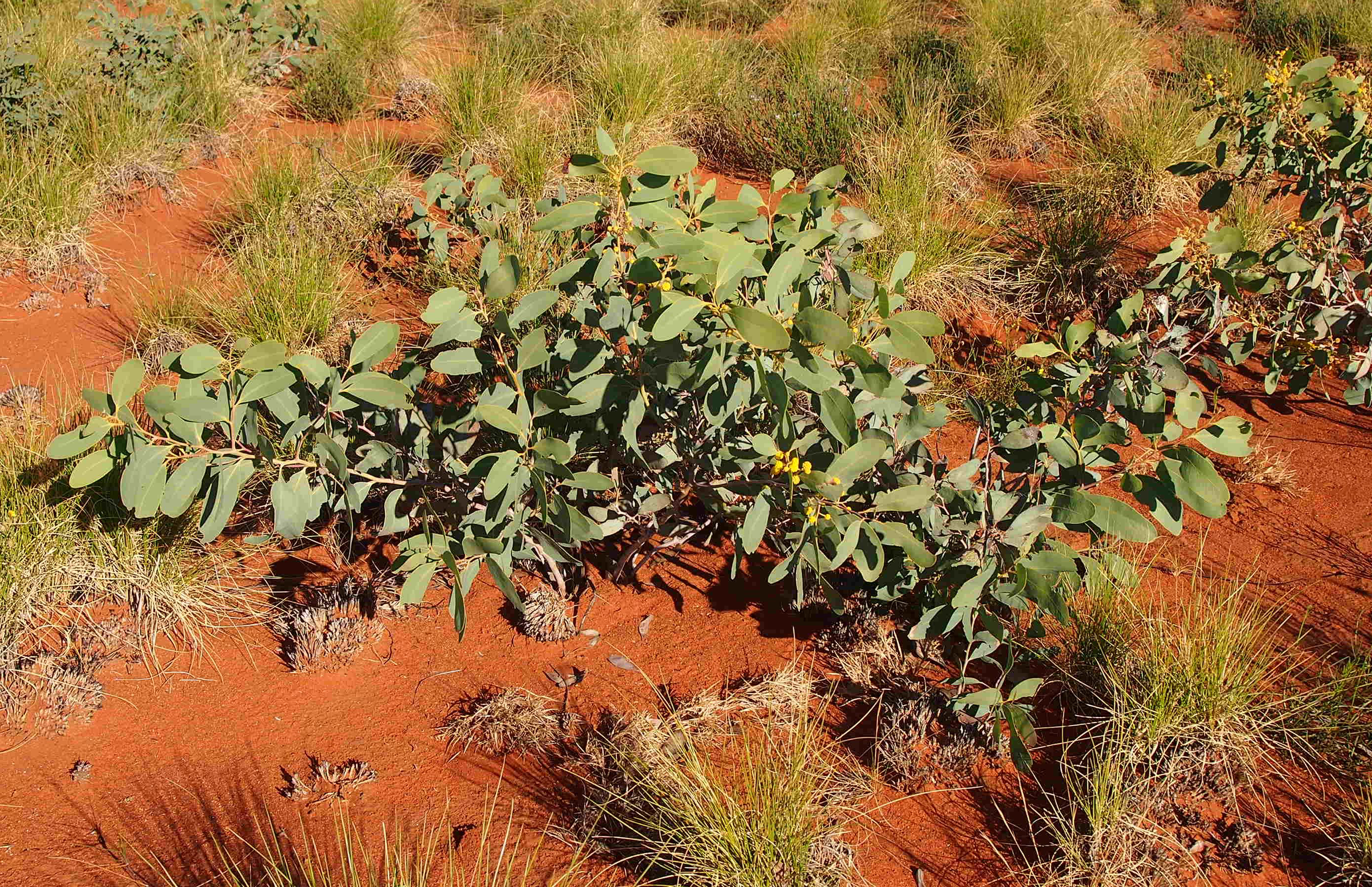
Habit

Acacia validinervia also commonly known as nyalanyalara, nyala nyala, alumaru or blue wattle, is a shrub of the genus Acacia and the subgenus Phyllodineae endemic to arid areas of inland Australia.

== Description ==
The erect slender shrub typically grows to a height of 1 to 4 metres (3 to 13 ft). It can have a straggly or spindly habit with multiple stems. The glabrous branchlets and branches are covered in a fine, white powdery coating. Like most species of Acacia it has phyllodes rather than true leaves. The evergreen phyllodes have an elliptic to oblanceolate shape that can be slightly recurved. Each phyllode is 6 to 13 centimetres (2 to 5 in) in length and 15 to 55 millimetres (0.59 to 2.17 in) wide with a thick leathery texture and have a prominent midrib and marginal nerves. It blooms from July to August and produces yellow flowers. The spherical inflorescences flower-heads have a diameter of 5 to 6 mm (0.20 to 0.24 in) containing 50 to 80 densely packed golden flowers. The firmly chartaceous to thinly coriaceous seed pods that form after flowering have a narrowly oblong shape and are straight to slightly curved with a length of up to 12 cm (4.7 in) and a width of 7 to 8 mm (0.28 to 0.31 in). The seeds inside are arranged longitudinally to slightly obliquely and have an oblong to elliptic shape with a length of 5 to 8 mm (0.20 to 0.31 in) and a width of 3 to 5 mm (0.12 to 0.20 in).

== Distribution ==
It is native to the north western margins of the Simpson Desert in the Northern Territory in the north down to around the Musgrave and Tomkinson Ranges of South Australia. It is also found in parts of Western Australia. In South Australia it is situated along dry creeks and river beds. In an area in the desert in the Central Ranges of the eastern Goldfields it can be found growing in red sand, stony sand, loamy or clay soils.

== See also ==
- List of Acacia species
