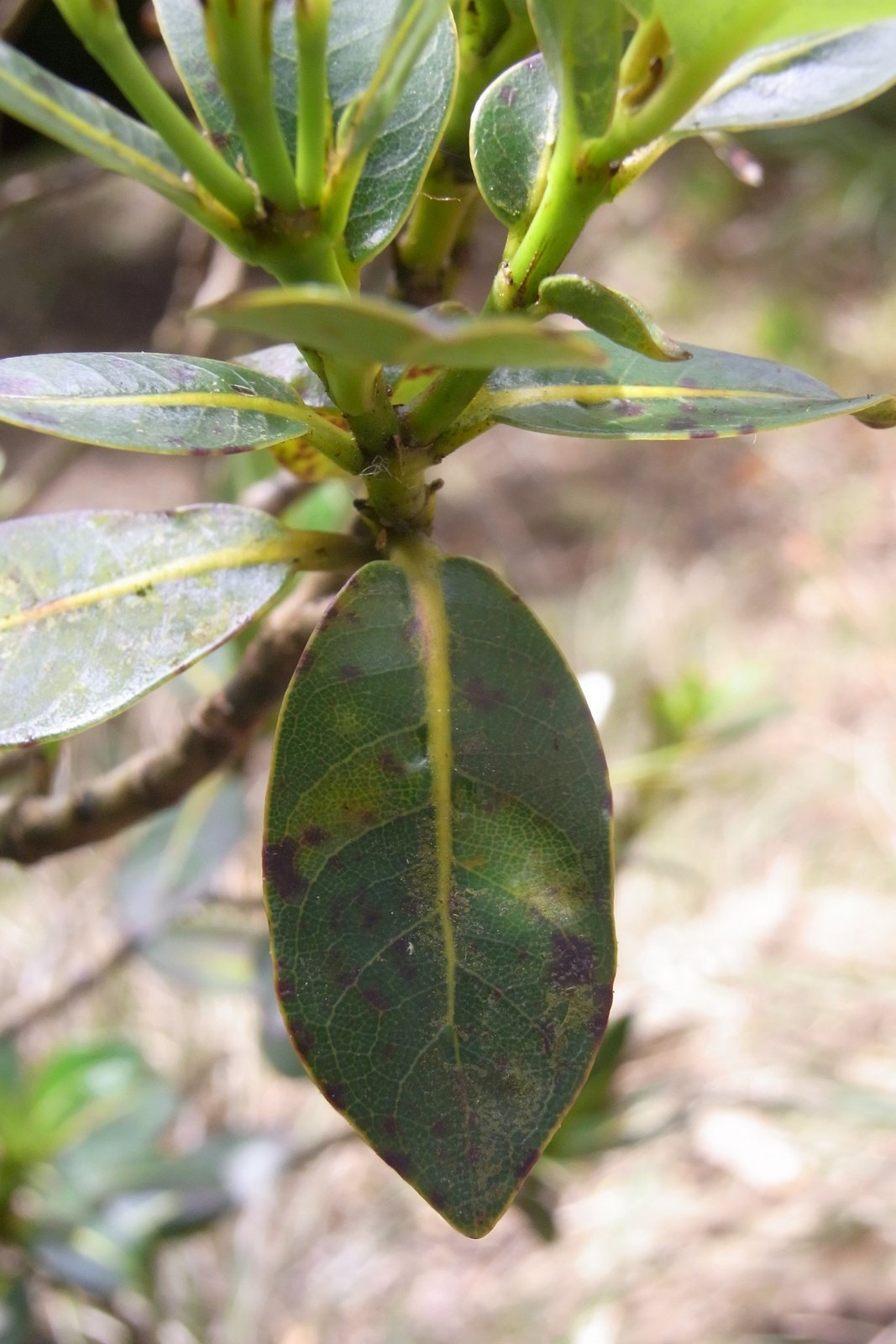

Scientific classification
- Kingdom: Plantae
- Clade: Tracheophytes
- Clade: Angiosperms
- Clade: Magnoliids
- Order: Laurales
- Family: Lauraceae
- Genus: Cryptocarya
- Species: C. gregsonii

Binomial name
- Cryptocarya gregsonii Maiden

= Cryptocarya gregsonii =

Species of flowering plant

Cryptocarya gregsonii, commonly known as native blackbutt, black plum or blackbutt, is a species of flowering plant in the laurel family and is endemic to Lord Howe Island. It is a small tree with thick, leathery, egg-shaped to more or less round leaves, green flowers and fleshy black drupes.

== Description ==
Cryptocarya gregsonii is a small tree that typically grows to a height of up to 12 m (39 ft). The leaves are thick and leathery, egg-shaped to more or less round or elliptic, 30–80 mm (1.2–3.1 in) long and up to 55 mm (2.2 in) wide. The flowers are green, small in number, about 5 mm (0.20 in) in diameter, borne in the axils of upper leaves. Flowering occurs from November to February and the fruit is a black, fleshy, elliptic to oval drupe, 40–60 mm (1.6–2.4 in) long, 35–40 mm (1.4–1.6 in) wide and about 25 mm (0.98 in) thick.

== Taxonomy ==
Cryptocarya gregsonii was first formally described in 1902 by Joseph Maiden in the Proceedings of the Linnean Society of New South Wales. It was named by Maiden after his friend Jesse Gregson of Newcastle.

== Distribution and habitat ==
Native blackbutt is endemic to Lord Howe Island where it prefers moist, sheltered areas. It is ocally abundant in the southern mountains of the island, from an altitude of 300 m (980 ft) to the summit of Mount Gower at 875 m (2,871 ft).
