= Acacia armitii =

Conservation status
- Near Threatened (NCA)

Scientific classification
- Kingdom: Plantae
- Clade: Tracheophytes
- Clade: Angiosperms
- Clade: Eudicots
- Clade: Rosids
- Order: Fabales
- Family: Fabaceae
- Subfamily: Caesalpinioideae
- Clade: Mimosoid clade
- Genus: Acacia
- Species: A. armitii

Binomial name
- Acacia armitii F.Muell. ex Maiden
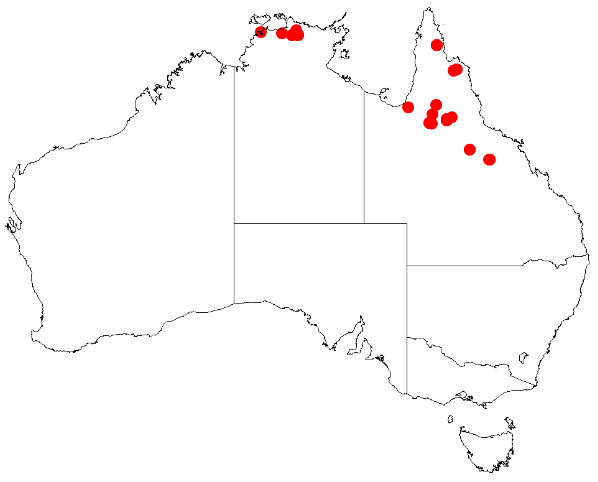
- Occurrence data from AVH

Synonyms
- Racosperma armitii (F.Muell. ex Maiden) Pedley; Acacia delibrata auct. non A.Cunn. ex Benth.: Mueller, F.J.H. von (1888)

Species of legume

Acacia armitii is a species of flowering plant in the family Fabaceae and is endemic to north-eastern Australia. It has more or less erect, very narrowly elliptic to linear phyllodes, flowers arranged in solitary spikes in axils, and linear pods up to 55 mm (2.2 in) long.

== Description ==
Acacia armitii is a shrub or slender tree that typically grows to a height of 7.5 m (25 ft) and has grey and fissured, bark and glabrous, fawn to yellow, prominently angled branchlets. The phyllodes are more or less erect, mostly 90–170 mm (3.5–6.7 in) long and 6–17 mm (0.24–0.67 in) wide, yellowish-green, and leathery to thinly leathery. There is a prominent, single, yellowish midvein and a less prominent vein either side of it. There is a single elliptic gland about 1 mm (0.039 in) long at the base of the phyllode. The flowers are yellowish and are borne in a solitary spike in axils. Flowering occurs in June and July, or in September and October, and the fruit is a yellowish-brown pod 27–55 mm (1.1–2.2 in) long and 3.4–4.7 mm (0.13–0.19 in) wide containing five to ten seeds.

== Taxonomy ==
Acacia armitii was first formally described in 1917 by Maiden in Journal and Proceedings of the Royal Society of New South Wales from an unpublished description by Ferdinand von Mueller. The specific epithet (armitii) honours William Edington Armit.

== Distribution ==
This species of Acacia is only known from areas around the Einasleigh River in central-northern Queensland, and on a sandstone plateau to the south of the Goomadeer River and at Coopers Creek near Nabarlek in the Northern Territory. It grows in rocky, sandy or shallow soils along creek banks and river flats and floodplains.

== Conservation status ==
Acacia armitii is listed as "near threatened" under the Queensland Government Nature Conservation Act 1992 and as "data deficient" under the Northern Territory Government Territory Parks and Wildlife Conservation Act.

== See also ==
- List of Acacia species
