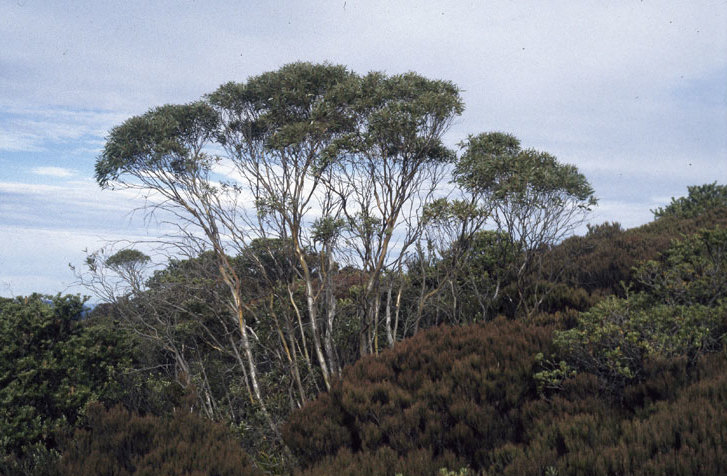

Scientific classification
- Kingdom: Plantae
- Clade: Embryophytes
- Clade: Tracheophytes
- Clade: Spermatophytes
- Clade: Angiosperms
- Clade: Eudicots
- Clade: Rosids
- Order: Myrtales
- Family: Myrtaceae
- Genus: Eucalyptus
- Species: E. kybeanensis

Binomial name
- Eucalyptus kybeanensis Maiden & Cambage

= Eucalyptus kybeanensis =

Kybean mallee ash

Species of eucalyptus

Eucalyptus kybeanensis, commonly known as the Kybean mallee ash, is a species of mallee or tree that is endemic to south eastern Australia. It has smooth, white or greyish bark, lance-shaped adult leaves, flower buds in groups of seven, nine or eleven, white flowers and conical or hemispherical fruit.

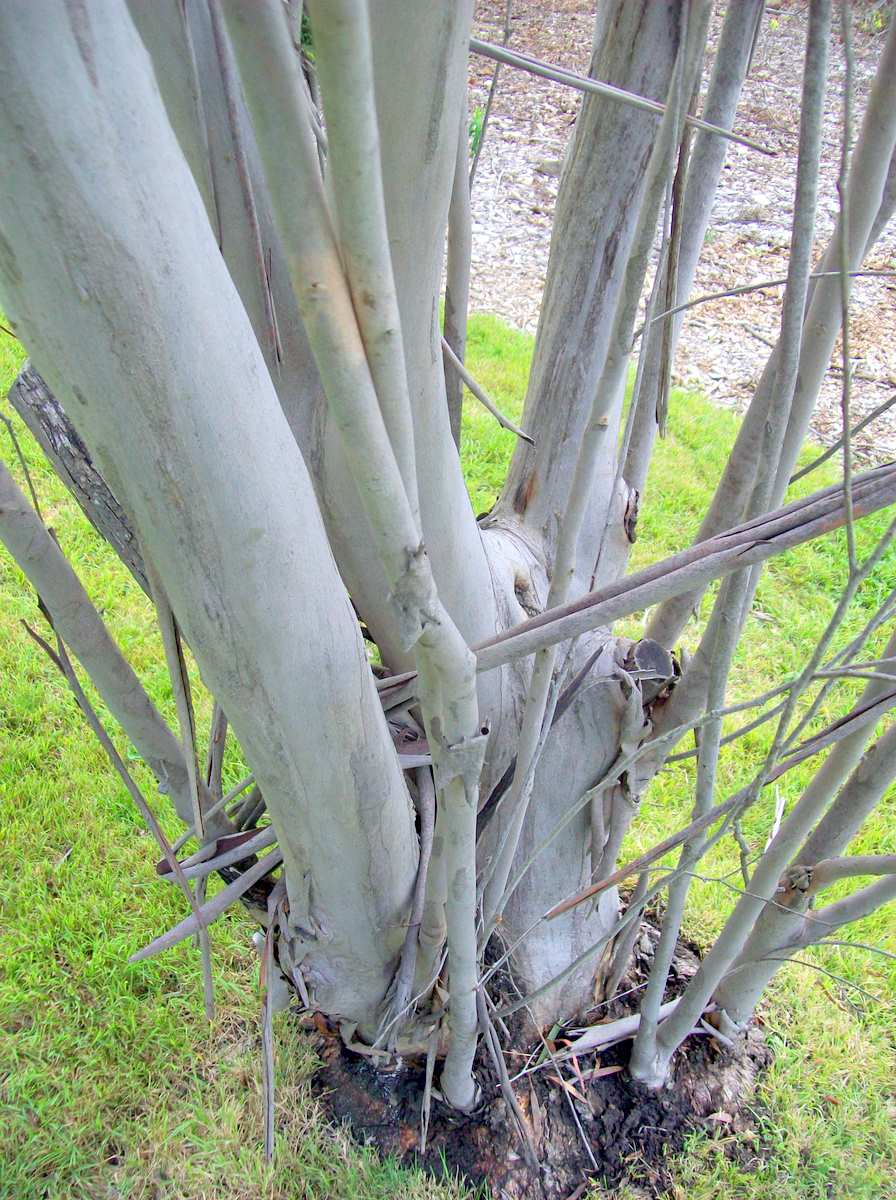
Bark

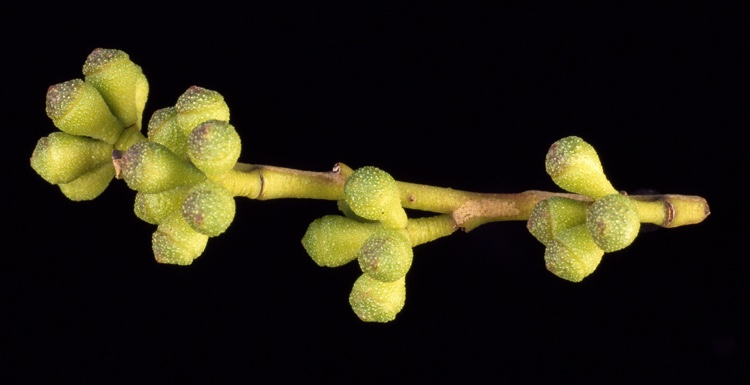
Flower buds

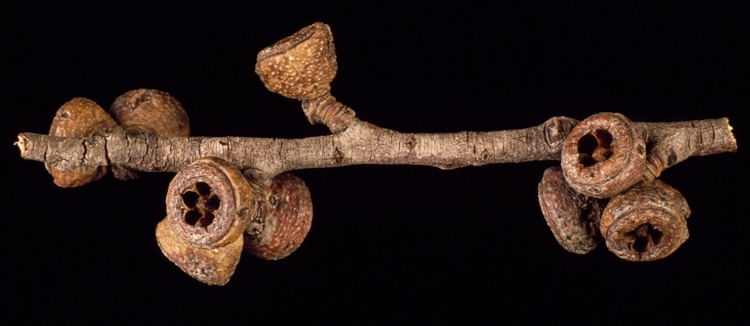
Fruit

== Description ==
Eucalyptus kybeanensis is a mallee that typically grows to a height of 4–6 m (13–20 ft), rarely a tree to 18 m (59 ft), and forms a lignotuber. It has smooth grey or greenish bark, sometimes with insect scribbles and sometimes with a short stocking of rough bark at the base. Young plants and coppice regrowth have warty stems and glossy green, lance-shaped or curved leaves that are 35–85 mm (1.4–3.3 in) long and 6–16 mm (0.24–0.63 in) wide. Adult leaves are the same glossy green on both sides, lance-shaped or curved, 50–110 mm (2.0–4.3 in) long and 5–15 mm (0.20–0.59 in) wide on a petiole 3–8 mm (0.12–0.31 in) long. The flower buds are arranged in leaf axils in groups of seven, nine or eleven on an unbranched peduncle, the individual buds more or less sessile. Mature buds are oval to oblong, 4–5 mm (0.16–0.20 in) long and wide with a rounded to flattened operculum. Flowering occurs between September and December and the flowers are white. The fruit is a woody conical or hemispherical capsule 4–6 mm (0.16–0.24 in) long and 5–9 mm (0.20–0.35 in) wide with the valves near rim level.

== Taxonomy and naming ==
Eucalyptus kybeanensis was first formally described in 1915 by Joseph Maiden and Richard Cambage from a specimen collected by Cambage on 4 November 1908, and that "grew on sandy conglomerate formation at Kybean, amongst Casuarina nana, Sieber, near the Kydra Trigonometrical Station, on the Great Dividing Range, 4,000 feet above sea-level, sixteen miles easterly from Nimitybelle". The specific epithet (kybeanensis) refers to the locality of Kybean in New South Wales.

== Distribution and habitat ==
Kybean mallee ash grows in exposed positions at high altitude where it is often locally dominant in subalpine mallee scrubs. It occurs south from near Kybean in the far south-west of New South Wales and in the Victorian High Country.
