= Indigenous Australian food groups =

Indigenous Australian peoples traditionally classified food sources in a methodical way. Below are a few examples.

== Central Australia ==
In Central Australia, people used innovative means to obtain a balanced diet.

The food categories, and their Arrernte names, are:

| Arrernte name | Foods | Examples |
|---|---|---|
| Kere | food from animals; meat, fat, offal, blood, eggs | Kere arlewatyerre (goanna), Kere ulkerte (perentie), Kere arntetherrke (carpet snake), Kere aherre (kangaroo), Kere antenhe (possum), Kere inape (echidna), Kere ankerre (emu) |
| Merne | food from plants; fruit, vegetables | Merne atwakeye (wild orange), Merne arrutnenge (wild passionfruit), Merne pmerlpe (quandong), Merne mwanyeme (bush tomato), Merne arnweketye (conkerberry), Merne alangkwe (bush banana), Merne arlatyeye (pencil yam). Merne marre (honey beans) |
| Ntange (Merne ntange) | edible seeds | Merne ntange ulyawe (Pigweed seed), Merne ntange arlepe (Prickly wattle seed), Merne ntange artetye (Mulga seed), Merne ntange arlketyerre (Dead finish seed). (See also: seedcakes) |
| Tyape | edible grubs and insects; witchetties, cicadas | Tyape atnyematye (Witchetty grub), Tyape ahernenge (River red gum grub), Tyape ankerrutne (coolibah tree grub), Tyape tyerraye (Cicadas), Tyape ayepe-arenye (Tar vine caterpillars). Tyape atnyematye (Witchetty grub): find cracks in the ground underneath a Witchetty bush (Acacia kempeana) and dig there; lever up swollen root where the grubs are located; eat grubs raw or cooked in hot earth; squash guts of the grubs onto sores |
| Ngkwarle | honey-like foods; nectar, wild honey, lerps, gum | Main article: Australian Aboriginal sweet foods Ngkwarle athenge arlperle (Ironwood tree gum), Ngkwarle alkerampwe (Mulga tree gum, Ngkwarle arlperrampwe (Whitewood tree gum, Ngkwarle atnyerampwe (Supplejack tree gum), Ngkwarle akikarre (Witchetty bush gum), Ngkwarle aperarnte (river red gum honeydew, Ngkwarle yerrampe, (Honeyant), Ngkwarle arwengalkere (Native bee honey), Ngkwarle untyeyampe (Corkwood flower nectar). |

Some other category words from Arrernte that are used in relation to food include:

- Thipe fleshy flying creatures; birds (not emus), bats
- Kwatye water in any form, sources of water; water, rain, clouds
- Arne trees, shrubs, bushes, woody plants, some grasses
- Ure fire, things to do with fire.

== Top End ==
In the Top End, seafood plays an important part in the diet. The food groups and their Yolngu names are:

MARANHU (foods)
| Murnyaŋ' (plant or vegetable food); Alternative names: Dhäkadatj; Ŋayaŋay', Buku-bira' | Gonyil (meat, shellfish, eggs); Alternative names: Matha-yal, Merrpal'Matha-bira, Ŋänarr-yal |
| 1. Borum— fruits | 1. Warrakan'— land animals and birds |
| 2. Guku— bee products | 2. Miyapunu— marine mammals |
| 3. Ŋatha— root foods | 3. Maranydjalk— rays and sharks |
| 4. Manutji Ŋatha— seeds | 4. Guya— fish |
| 5. Mudhuŋay— cycad foodstuffs | 5. Maypal— shellfish, crabs |
| | 6. Mapu— eggs |

The old people would talk about the need to eat from both murŋyan' and gonyil food groups and the need to supplement their diet with gapu (fresh water). While this balance was maintained, the people knew they were eating correctly.

When the men would come back from the magpie goose hunt, they would be craving murnyaŋ foods after having eaten so much meat and eggs. Meanwhile, the women, children and old people back in the camps would be looking forward to gonyil, magpie goose meat and eggs, after eating so much murnyaŋ'.
