= Acacia dolichophylla =

Chewings Range wattle

Scientific classification
- Kingdom: Plantae
- Clade: Tracheophytes
- Clade: Angiosperms
- Clade: Eudicots
- Clade: Rosids
- Order: Fabales
- Family: Fabaceae
- Subfamily: Caesalpinioideae
- Clade: Mimosoid clade
- Genus: Acacia
- Species: A. dolichophylla

Binomial name
- Acacia dolichophylla Maslin
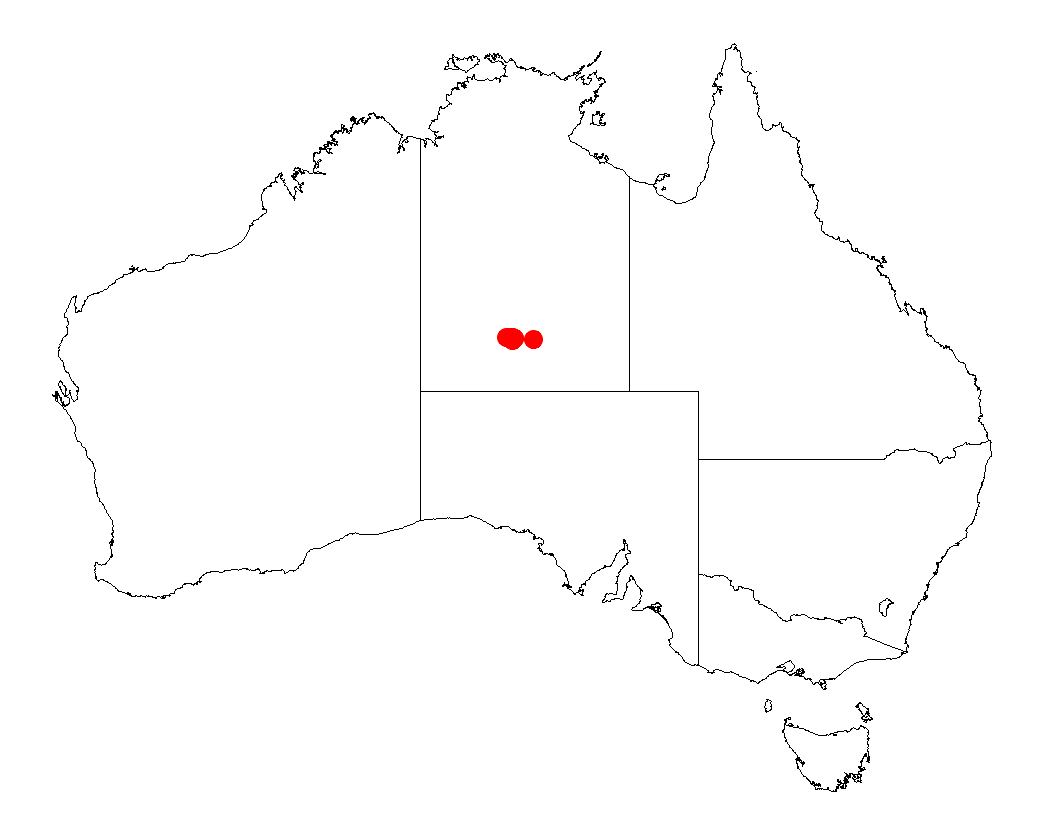
- Occurrence data from AVH

Synonyms
- Racosperma dolicophyllum (Maslin) Pedley

Species of legume

Acacia dolichophylla, also known as Chewings Range wattle, is a species of flowering plant in the family Fabaceae and is endemic to the Northern Territory of Australia. It is a bushy shrub with finely ribbed branchlets, narrowly elliptic phyllodes, spherical heads of pale yellow to light golden yellow flowers and linear, more or less papery pods.

== Description ==
Acacia dolichophylla is a bushy shrub that typically grows to a height of 3–4 m (9.8–13.1 ft), sometimes to 7 m (23 ft) and has smooth, greyish bark and finely ribbed branchlets. Its phyllodes are flat, narrowly linear 120–190 mm (4.7–7.5 in) long and 1–2 mm (0.039–0.079 in) wide with three raised veins. The flowers are borne in up to five spherical heads in racemes 0.5–2 mm (0.020–0.079 in) long on peduncles 9–13 mm (0.35–0.51 in) long, each head about 4.5 mm (0.18 in) in diameter with about 25 pale yellow to light golden yellow flowers. Flowering has been recorded in March, April and from June to September, and the pods are linear, flat, slightly raised over and constricted between the seeds, up to 100 mm (3.9 in) long, 5–7 mm (0.20–0.28 in) wide and more or less papery. The seeds are elliptic, 4.0–4.5 mm (0.16–0.18 in) long and lack an aril.

== Taxonomy ==
Acacia dolichophylla was first formally described in 1980 by the botanist Bruce Maslin in the Journal of the Adelaide Botanic Gardens from specimens collected from Mount Giles. The specific epithet (dolichophylla) refers to the very long phyllodes.

This wattle is similar is appearance to A. praelongata and A. estrophiolata and is related to A. tenuior.

== Distribution and habitat ==
Chewings Range wattle grows in steep, sheltered gullies in schistose hills and is only known from Chewings Range in the southern part of the Northern Territory.

== Conservation status ==
Acacia dolichophylla is listed as "near threatened" under the Northern Territory Territory Parks and Wildlife Conservation Act.

== See also ==
- List of Acacia species
