= Australian Aboriginal sweets =

Sweets eaten by indigenous Australians

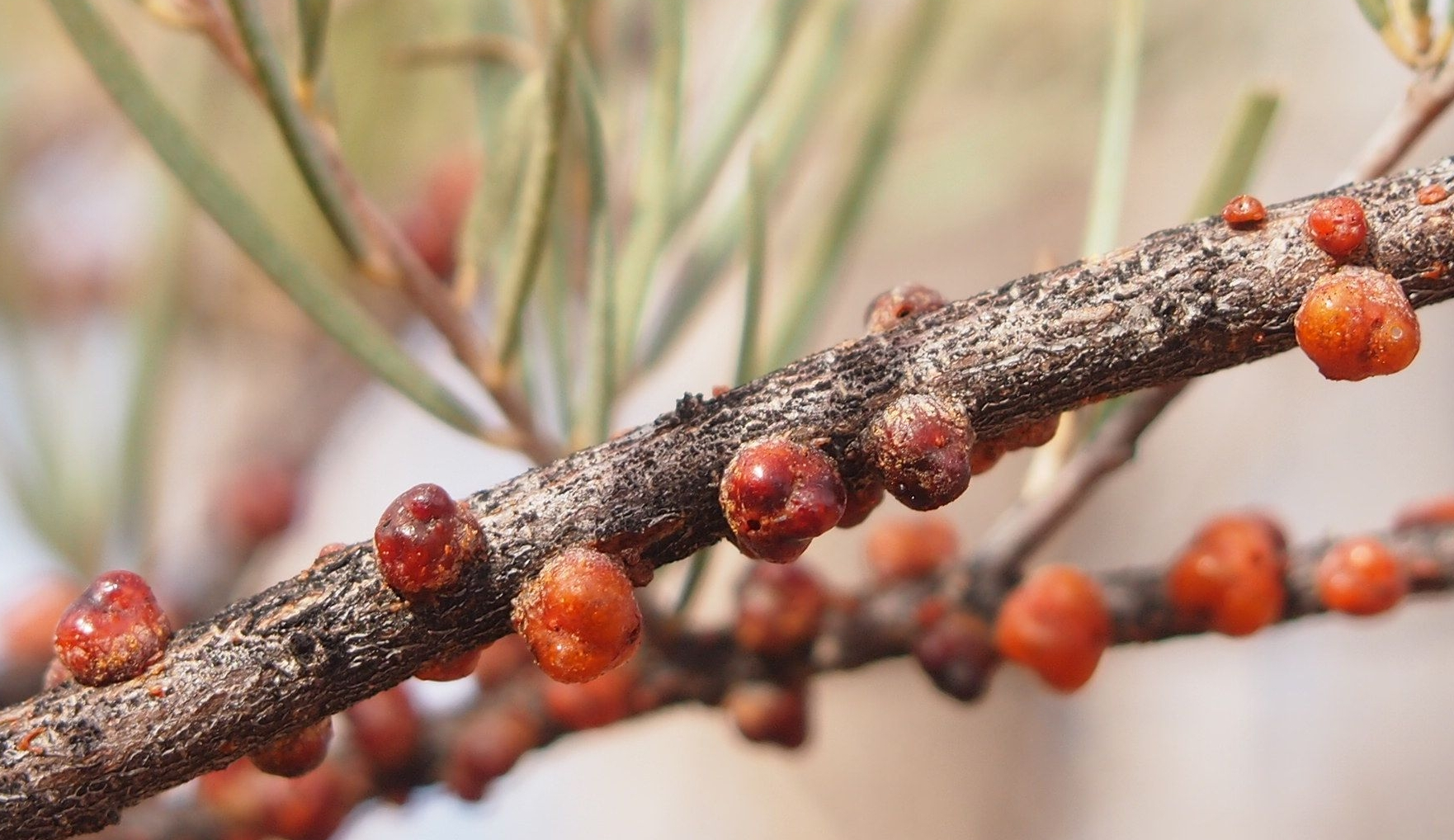
Red lerps (Austrochardia acaciae) on a mulga tree, Central Australia

Australian Aboriginal bush tucker traditions feature various sweet foods. The four main types of sweet foods gathered (apart from ripe fruit) are:

- Honey from ants and wild bees ("sugarbag")
- Leaf scale (lerps, from honeydew)
- Tree sap
- Flower nectar

In some parts of Australia, these customs are still used today, particularly in Central Australia.

== Arrernte sweet foods and drinks ==
The Arrernte of Central Australia divide their food up into a number of groups, in a way typical to many Aboriginal cultures. The Arrernte word for sweet foods is Ngkwarle (pronunciation: /ᵑɡʷaɭə/), meaning "honey-like foods".

Some Aboriginal people who still have their language often refer to alcohol by this sweet food group term.

Arrernte Name	English name	Details
Ngkwarle athenge arlperle	Ironwood (Acacia estrophiolata) tree gum	Ironwood gum is broken off tree branches. It can be red or clear. It runs down the tree to the ground in long beads. It is snapped off and mixed in some water and left to set. It is then scooped up with a little stick and eaten.
Ngkwarle alkerampwe	Mulga (Acacia aneura) tree gum	Gum can be found sitting in small blobs in a row on branches. Some bits are clear and some red. They are snapped off with a wooden skewer. Once quite a few are collected, they are given to the children as a treat.
Ngkwarle arlperrampwe	Whitewood (Atalaya hemiglauca) tree gum	Arlperrampwe is found on the trunk and branches of the whitewood in big globs. Some of it runs down the tree as its hanging there. It is collected and made into a lump and kneaded until soft, and is then eaten.
Ngkwarle atnyerampwe	Supplejack (Ventilago viminalis) tree gum	Gum is scraped off after it comes through the bark. It is twisted onto a stick. It is chewy like chewing gum. Only small amounts can be eaten without water or it induces headache.
Ngkwarle akikarre	Witchetty bush (Acacia kempeana) gum	When the flowers start to fall from the Witchetty bush, the gum comes through the bark and forms lumps, usually on the trunk. Some is red and some is clear. It is kneaded into a lump, sprinkling a bit of water on it. It can be placed on a little stick to make a lollipop.
Ngkwarle aperarnte	River red gum (Eucalyptus camaldulensis) honeydew	Aperarnte is the sweet sap that drips down or is extracted from the bark of the river red gum. It is retrieved from the bark or from the ground after it has dripped down.
Ngkwarle aperaltye	River red gum (Eucalyptus camaldulensis, Psylla eucalypti) leaf scale	Small, waxy white flakes of aperaltye are found on the leaves of the river red gum. Branches can be shaken so that it falls onto a sheet or bowl below, then swept up and packed into a ball for eating.
Ngkwarle alhelpe-arenye	Mallee (Eucalyptus) leaf scale	Scale is scraped off to be eaten.
Ngkwarle yerrampe	Honeyant (Melophorus camponotus)	The honeyant is found in the ground in mulga country. Its nest is slightly different from other ants' nests. The holes on the surface are smaller. Women dig down from the openings, following the shaft, scooping out the dirt. Honeyants are harvested from the side in the main part of the nest. They are dragged out with a little stick. They are not swallowed, but placed on the tongue and the abdomen is bitten and honey sucked from it.
Ngkwarle arwengalkere; Ngkwarle urltampe	Native bee honey, sugarbag	Sugarbag is found in tree hollows. A small 'nose' is found made of wax, protruding from the tree. This is chopped into to split it open. The head part is retrieved first, where the larvae are, then the honey. Honey is gathered in a coolamon or billycan to be eaten later.
Ngkwarle untyeyampe	Corkwood (Hakea suberea) flower nectar	When the yellow flowers hang down, corkwood flower nectar is ready to harvest. The nectar is shaken onto a hand and then the dark bits that fall there are licked off. Sometimes it can be placed in water and drunk. It can be used for this purpose when a person is sick. Everyone likes to collect this food.
Ngkwarle ntewale	Bloodwood (Eucalyptus opaca) flower nectar	Ntewale is the flower of the bloodwood tree. It has a pale nectar. Native bees make honey from these flowers. The flower is broken off and sucked, or nectar shaken onto the hand and the hand licked. When the flowers die off, the bush coconuts come.

== Other sweet foods and drinks ==
The practices of the Arrernte were widely practised by many other groups across Australia, however customs varied depending on where people lived. Other notable sweet foods include:

- Banksia: People placed the flower spike in a paperbark-lined hole filled with water to make a sweet drink.
- Grevillea: Nectar shaken and eaten, or mixed with water to make a sweet drink.
- Xanthorrhoea: Sweet drink from nectar by soaking in water.

== See also ==
- Bush tucker
- Australian cuisine
