= Acacia subcontorta =

Scientific classification
- Kingdom: Plantae
- Clade: Tracheophytes
- Clade: Angiosperms
- Clade: Eudicots
- Clade: Rosids
- Order: Fabales
- Family: Fabaceae
- Subfamily: Caesalpinioideae
- Clade: Mimosoid clade
- Genus: Acacia
- Species: A. subcontorta

Binomial name
- Acacia subcontorta Maslin
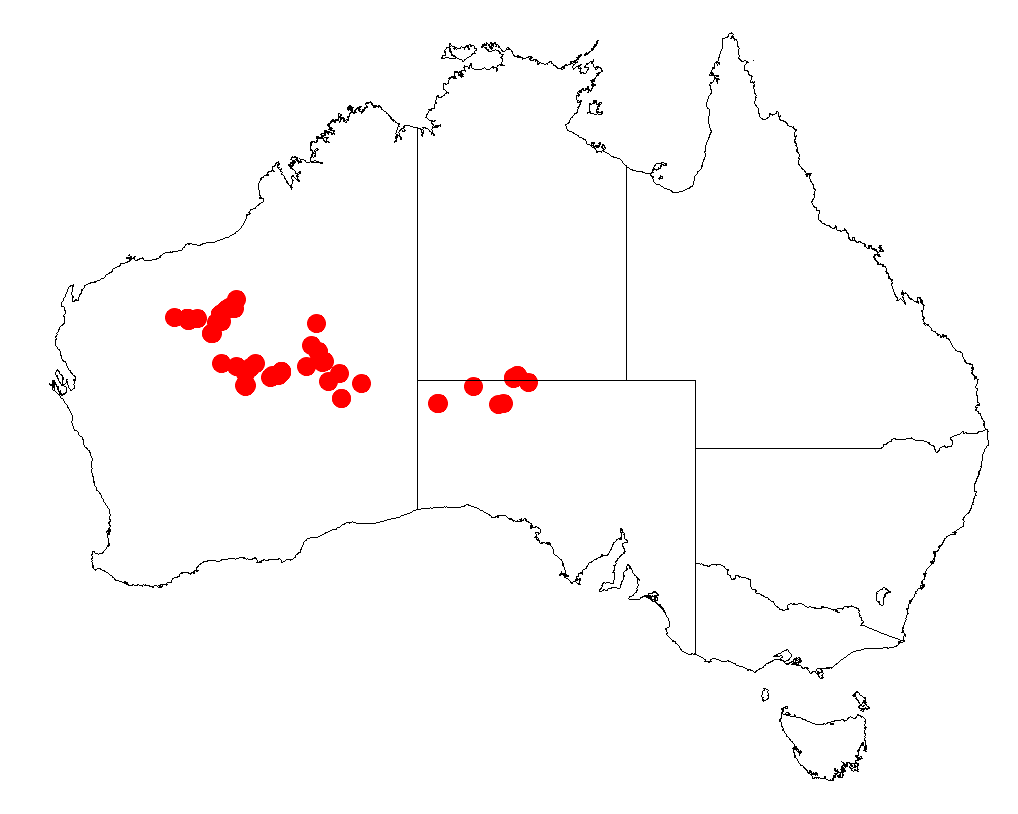
- Occurrence data from AVH

Species of legume

Acacia subcontorta is a shrub belonging to the genus Acacia and the subgenus Juliflorae that is endemic to central and central western Australia.

== Description ==
The shrub or trees usually has multiple stems and typically grows to a height of 1 to 8 m (3 ft 3 in to 26 ft 3 in) with a rounded and spreading crown that is 1 to 5 m (3 ft 3 in to 16 ft 5 in) across and becomes sparser with age. The trunks appear contorted and have a diameter of around 10 to 15 cm (3.9 to 5.9 in) at breast height and with the contorted looking main branches spreading more or less horizontally. The thin grey coloured bark has a fibrous texture and is longitudinally fissured along the main branches and trunks. The terete and glabrous branchlets have obscure ribbing and are a light brown colour at the extremities. Like most species of Acacia it has phyllodes rather than true leaves. The evergreen, moderately coriaceous to sub-rigid phyllodes have a linear to narrowly elliptic shape with a length of 6 to 11 cm (2.4 to 4.3 in) and a width of 2 to 8 mm (0.079 to 0.315 in) with many fine parallel longitudinal nerves.

== Distribution ==
It is native to a large area in the Pilbara and northern Goldfields regions of Western Australia where its distribution is scattered and its range extends from around 150 km (93 mi) north west of Wiluna in the south then eastwards into the Gibson Desert. In the north it is found on Balfour Downs and Ethel Creek Stations as well as in the Hamersley Range. The species shares much of the range of Acacia thoma. It is often situated on gently undulating plains and stony hardpan plains with skeletal shallow red-brown loamy soils mixed with ironstone pebbles and cobbles as a part of open Mulga woodland communities, sometimes with a spinifex understorey.

== See also ==
- List of Acacia species
