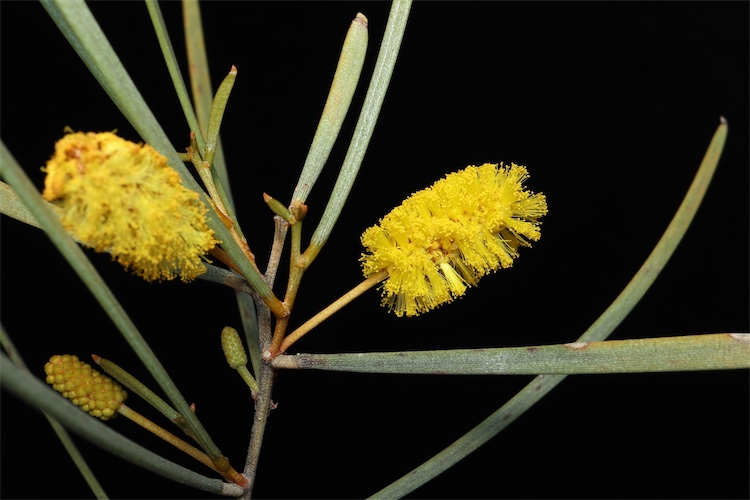

Scientific classification
- Kingdom: Plantae
- Clade: Embryophytes
- Clade: Tracheophytes
- Clade: Spermatophytes
- Clade: Angiosperms
- Clade: Eudicots
- Clade: Rosids
- Order: Fabales
- Family: Fabaceae
- Subfamily: Caesalpinioideae
- Clade: Mimosoid clade
- Genus: Acacia
- Species: A. rhodophloia

Binomial name
- Acacia rhodophloia Maslin
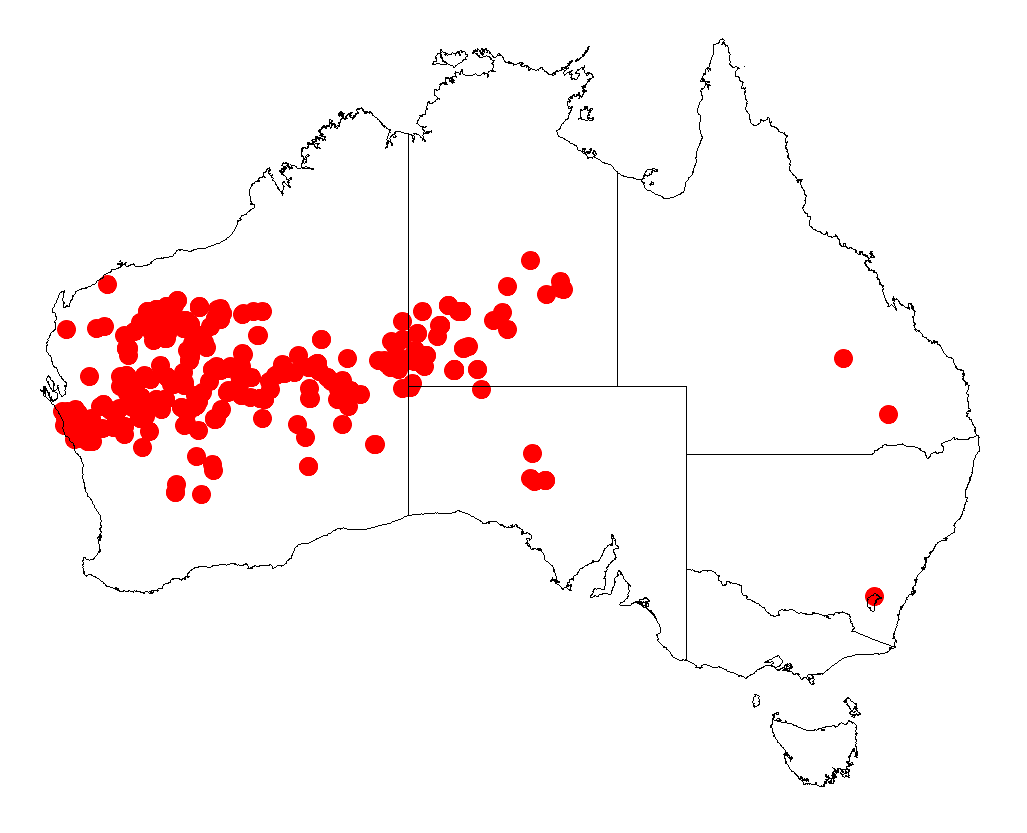
- Occurrence data from AVH

= Acacia rhodophloia =

Minni ritchi

Species of legume

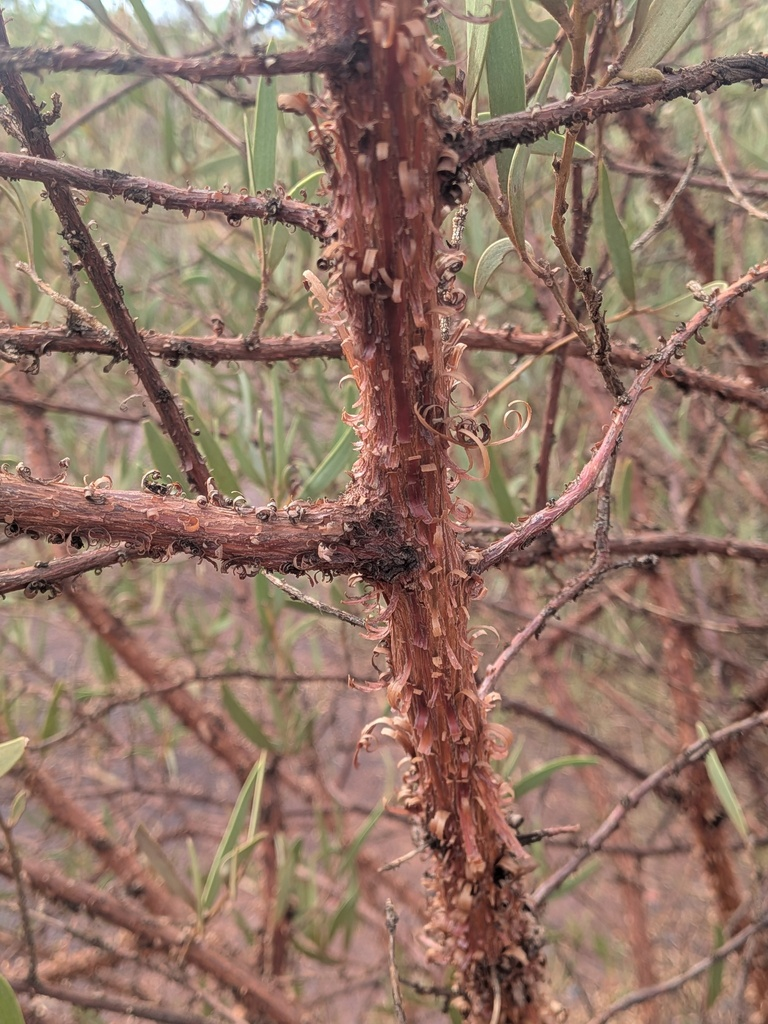
Bark, near Newman

Acacia rhodophloia, commonly known as minni ritchi or western red mulga, is a tree or shrub belonging to the genus Acacia and the subgenus Juliflorae that is endemic to a large area of arid central western Australia. The Indigenous group the Kurrama peoples know the plant as mantaru.

== Description ==
The variable tree or shrub typically grows to a height of 1.5 to 4 metres (5 to 13 ft) but can reach as high as 6 m (20 ft). It usually has a few main stems that are sparingly divided around ground level with the upper branches forming a usually horizontally spreading crown on mature plants. The multi-stemmed juvenile plants are more likely to have a rounded habit. The main stems and limbs have attractive red Minni ritchi style bark that curl back onto themselves into small scrolls. It has glabrous branchlets that can have indumentum covered in dried resin at the angled extremities. Like many species of Acacia it has phyllodes rather than true leaves. The evergreen, coriaceous and sub-rigid, narrowly elliptic to narrowly oblong and sometimes linear shaped phyllodes have a length of 2 to 10 cm (0.79 to 3.94 in) and a width of 2 to 13 mm (0.079 to 0.512 in). The ascending to erect, dull green to grey-green phyllodes are straight to shallowly sickle shaped are glabrous or sparsely haired with many fine longitudinal nerves that are very close together with a central nerve than can be more prominent than the others. It blooms sporadically from May to October or at other time following significant rainfall events producing yellow flowers. The simple inflorescences are found on 8 to 20 mm (0.31 to 0.79 in) long stalks. The globular to cylindrical flower-spikes have a length of 10 to 20 mm (0.39 to 0.79 in) and a width of 6 to 8 mm (0.24 to 0.31 in)long and are densely packed with golden flowers. The glabrous, thinly crustaceous, light grey to brown coloured seed pods that form after flowering are flat and linear with a length of 4 to 9 cm (1.6 to 3.5 in) and a width of 3 to 6 mm (0.12 to 0.24 in) and are straight to shallowly curved. The shiny dark brown to black coloured seeds within the pods are arranged longitudinally. The seeds have an obloid to obloid-ellipsoid shape with a length of 4 to 5 mm (0.16 to 0.20 in) and a width of 2.5 to 3 mm (0.098 to 0.118 in) with a white aril.

== Taxonomy ==
The species was first formally described in 1980 by the botanist Bruce Maslin as part of the work Acacia (Leguminosae-Mimosoideae): A contribution to the flora of central Australia as published in the Journal of the Adelaide Botanic Gardens. It was reclassified as Racosperma rhodophloia by Leslie Pedley in 2003 then transferred back to genus Acacia in 2006. The specific epithet is derived from the Greek words rhodo- meaning rose red and phloios meaning bark referring to the colour of the bark of this species. It is part of a small and complex group of species including Acacia adsurgens, Acacia kempeana and Acacia sibirica but is easily distinguished by the characteristic bark.

== Distribution ==
It is native to a large area in the Northern Territory and the Pilbara, Goldfields, Mid West and Kimberley regions of Western Australia where it is commonly situated on granite outcrops, sand plains and rocky hills and rises growing in sandy to gravelly soils. The range of the plant extends into the Northern Territory to around the Ehrenberg Range in the east and to Docker Creek and Bloods Range in the south with one population being recorded in South Australia to the north of Tarcoola It is known to grow in rocky areas in red-brown loamy to loamy clay soils usually as a part of Mulga communities where it can form small nearly pure stands but is also associated with scrub heath, Casuarina scrub communities or commonly found along with spinifex.

== See also ==
- List of Acacia species
