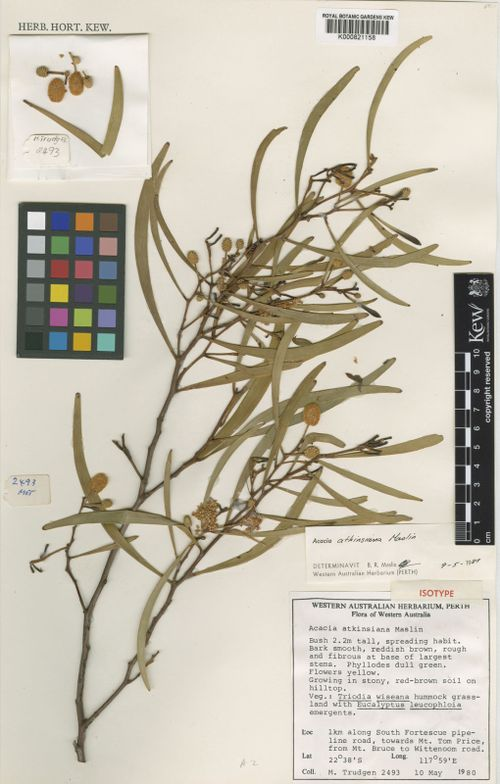
- Isotype in Kew Gardens

Scientific classification
- Kingdom: Plantae
- Clade: Tracheophytes
- Clade: Angiosperms
- Clade: Eudicots
- Clade: Rosids
- Order: Fabales
- Family: Fabaceae
- Subfamily: Caesalpinioideae
- Clade: Mimosoid clade
- Genus: Acacia
- Species: A. atkinsiana

Binomial name
- Acacia atkinsiana Maslin
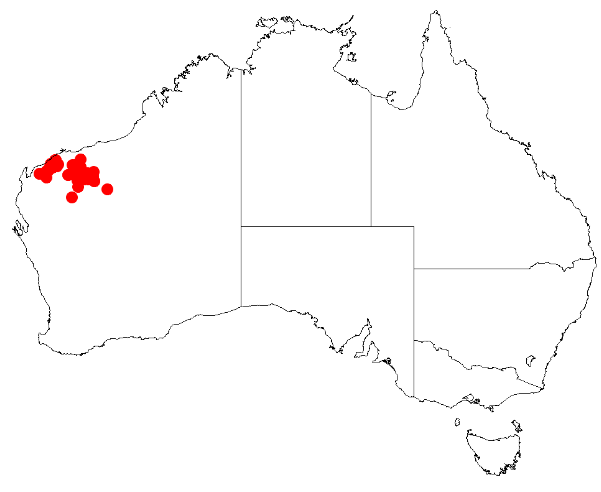
- Acacia atkinsiana occurrence data from Australasia Virtual Herbarium

Synonyms
- Racosperma atkinsianum (Maslin) Pedley

= Acacia atkinsiana =

Atkin's wattle

Species of legume

Acacia atkinsiana, commonly known as Atkin's wattle, is a species of flowering plant in the family Fabaceae, and is endemic to the north of Western Australia. The indigenous peoples of the area where the shrub is found, the Kurrama peoples, know the shrub as bilari or pilarri. It is an open, spreading, usually V-shaped shrub with very narrowly elliptic phyllodes and heads of oblong or spherical racemes of 70 to 90 densely-arranged flowers and linear pods up to 100 mm (3.9 in) long.

== Description ==
Acacia atkinsiana is an open, spreading, funnel-shaped that typically grows to a height of 1.3–3.6 m (4 ft 3 in – 11 ft 10 in). It mostly has a V-shaped habit but generally has three to six main stems, sometimes single-stemmed and with a spindly habit. The crown is more or less rounded and moderately dense to open, but sometimes bushy when regrowing. The bark is smooth, mid to dark grey and longitudinally fissured on the base of the main stems. Its phyllodes are very narrowly elliptic to lance-shaped with the narrower end towards the base, 60–145 mm (2.4–5.7 in) long, mostly 5–10 mm (0.20–0.39 in) wide and leathery. The phyllodes are glabrous and pale greyish-green with many parallel longitudinal veins. The flowers are borne in oblong or spherical heads 10–15 mm (0.39–0.59 in) long and 8–11 mm (0.31–0.43 in) wide on a stout peduncle 8–15 mm (0.31–0.59 in) long. Each head has 70 to 90 densely packed mid-golden flowers. Flowering occurs in most months, but with a main flush from June to July. The pods are linear, slightly curved, thinly crust-like to firmly papery, up to 100 mm (3.9 in) long and 4–6 mm (0.16–0.24 in) wide. The seeds are dark brown to black, 4.5–5 mm (0.18–0.20 in) long and about 2 mm (0.079 in) wide with a white aril. This species is closely allied to Acacia rhodophloia.

== Taxonomy ==
Acacia atkinsiana was first formally described by the botanist Bruce Maslin in the journal Nuytsia from specimens collected along a pipeline road from Mount Bruce to Wittenoom by Malcolm Trudgen. The specific epithet honours Mr Ken Atkins who provided much valuable field data and many species of Acacia from the Tom Price-Paraburdoo area".

== Distribution and habitat ==
This species of wattle grows in rocky loam on spinifex plains from Mount Bruce and the Hamersley Range to Yarraloola in the Gascoyne and Pilbara bioregions of Western Australia. There are a few isolated occurrences to the south in the Gascoyne region within the catchment of the Ashburton River. In the Pilbara the bulk of the population is situated between the central parts of the Hamersley Range in the east extending west to the North West Coastal Highway east of Onslow. It is often part of spinifex plain communities and open shrubland often with Acacia ancistrocarpa and Acacia bivenosa. It often forms dense, pure stands usually in disturbed areas including verges and burnt out areas having regenerated swiftly from seed.

== Conservation status ==
Acacia atkinsiana is listed as "not threatened" by the Government of Western Australia Department of Biodiversity, Conservation and Attractions.

== See also ==
- List of Acacia species
