= Acacia thoma =

Scientific classification
- Kingdom: Plantae
- Clade: Tracheophytes
- Clade: Angiosperms
- Clade: Eudicots
- Clade: Rosids
- Order: Fabales
- Family: Fabaceae
- Subfamily: Caesalpinioideae
- Clade: Mimosoid clade
- Genus: Acacia
- Species: A. thoma

Binomial name
- Acacia thoma Maslin
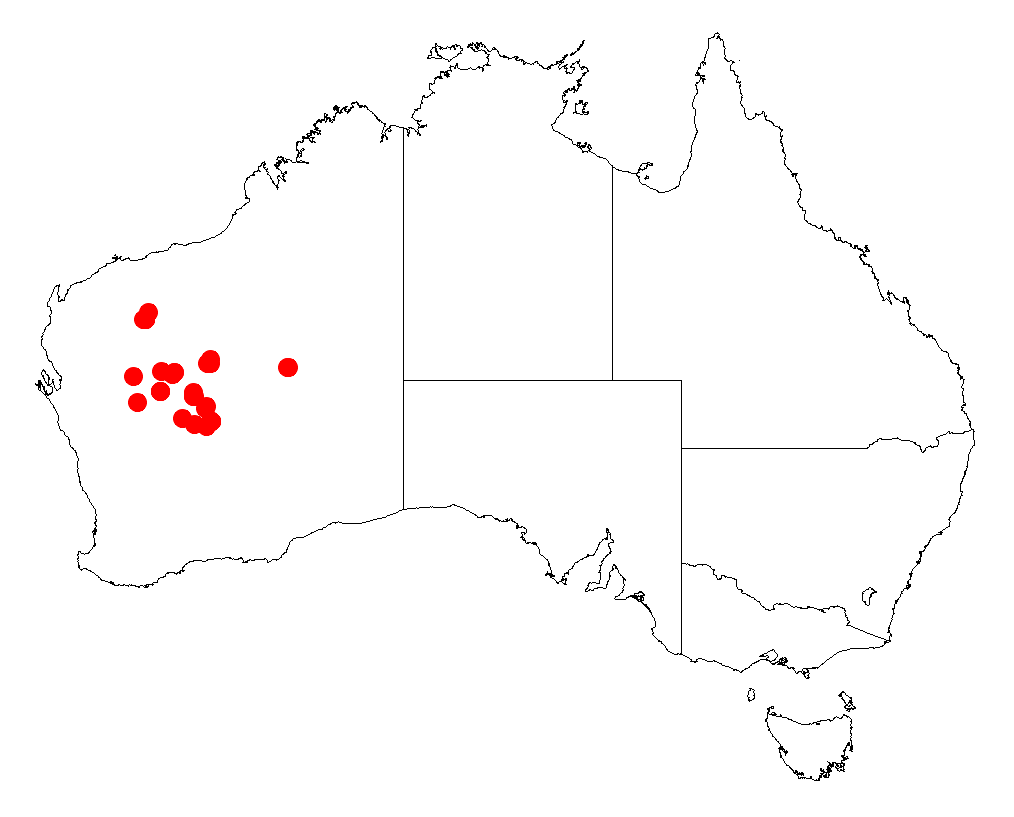
- Occurrence data from AVH

Species of legume

Acacia thoma is a shrub belonging to the genus Acacia and the subgenus Juliflorae that is endemic to arid areas of western Australia.

== Description ==
The multi-stemmed and obconic shrub crowns sparse to sub-dense and typically grows to a height of 1.5 to 3.5 metres (5 to 11 ft) with a width of 1.5-to-3.5-metre (4.9 to 11.5 ft). Bark on the upper branches is smooth and grey but becomes rough and longitudinally fissured at the base. It has light green new shoots with rudimentary caducous stipules that are resinous but not sticky. Like most species of Acacia it has phyllodes rather than true leaves. The dull green to grey green, coriaceous, sub-rigid and erect phyllodes have a narrowly linear to narrowly elliptic shape and a length of 5 to 8 cm (2.0 to 3.1 in) and a width of 2 to 4 mm (0.079 to 0.157 in). They are flat and straight to shallowly incurved with many parallel longitudinal fine nerves.

== Taxonomy ==
The plant is named for Emil Thoma, a Botanical Advisor with Rio Tinto Iron Ore, who assisted Maslin and provided samples and information on the species.

== Distribution ==
It is native to an area in the Mid West, Goldfields and Pilbara regions of Western Australia where it has a scattered distribution from the Pilbara region in the from the east of Paraburdoo north down to around Meekatharra in the south west and Leinster in the south extending out to around Mount Nossiter in the Little Sandy Desert in the eastern edge of its range. It is often situated on ridges and rocky slopes near the base of ranges composed of banded ironstone growing in skeletal soils as a part of open shrubland communities where it is usually associated with Acacia aneura, Acacia sibirica and Eremophila jucunda.

== See also ==
- List of Acacia species
