= Acacia praelongata =

Scientific classification
- Kingdom: Plantae
- Clade: Tracheophytes
- Clade: Angiosperms
- Clade: Eudicots
- Clade: Rosids
- Order: Fabales
- Family: Fabaceae
- Subfamily: Caesalpinioideae
- Clade: Mimosoid clade
- Genus: Acacia
- Species: A. praelongata

Binomial name
- Acacia praelongata F.Muell.
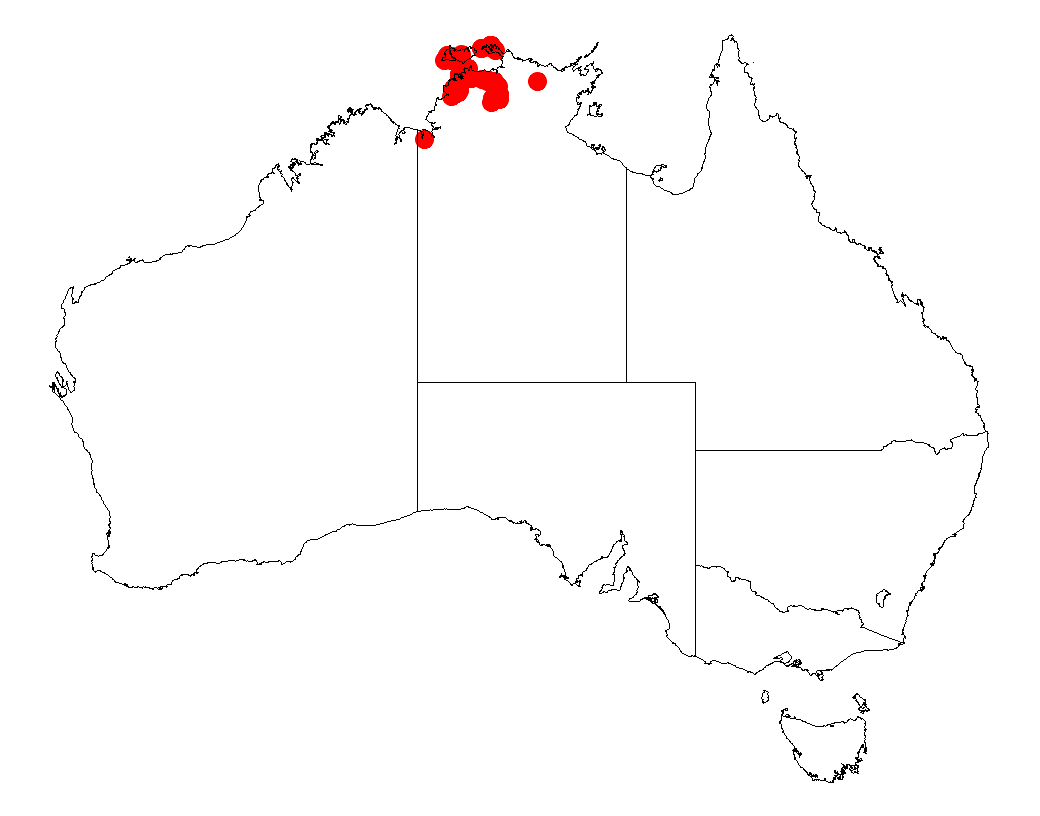
- Occurrence data from AVH

Species of legume

Acacia praelongata is a shrub of the genus Acacia and the subgenus Plurinerves that is endemic to are area of northern Australia.

== Description ==
The trees typically grow to a height of 4 to 6 m (13 to 20 ft) with a slender and delicate habit and has pendulous branches with hard and furrowed bark and glabrous branchlets. Like most species of Acacia it has phyllodes rather than true leaves. The pendulous, glabrous and evergreen phyllodes have a narrowly linear shape and are slightly incurved with a length of 12 to 24 cm (4.7 to 9.4 in) and a width of 1 to 3.5 mm (0.039 to 0.138 in) an have three main nerves with the midrib being the most prominent.

== Taxonomy ==
The species was first formally described by the botanist Ferdinand von Mueller in 1884 as published in The Australasian Chemist and Druggist. It was reclassified as Racosperma praelongatum by Leslie Pedley in 2003 then transferred back to genus Acacia in 2006.

== Distribution ==
It is found in north western parts of the Northern Territory including on Melville Island to the north and down to around Katherine in the south where it is found growing in gravelly lateritic soils with a scattered distribution amongst open woodland and forest communities.

== Cultivation ==
The plant is available commercially and is used in rockeries or in filling in gardens where it is noted as being waterwise, a good screening plant and being bird and butterfly attracting.

== See also ==
- List of Acacia species
