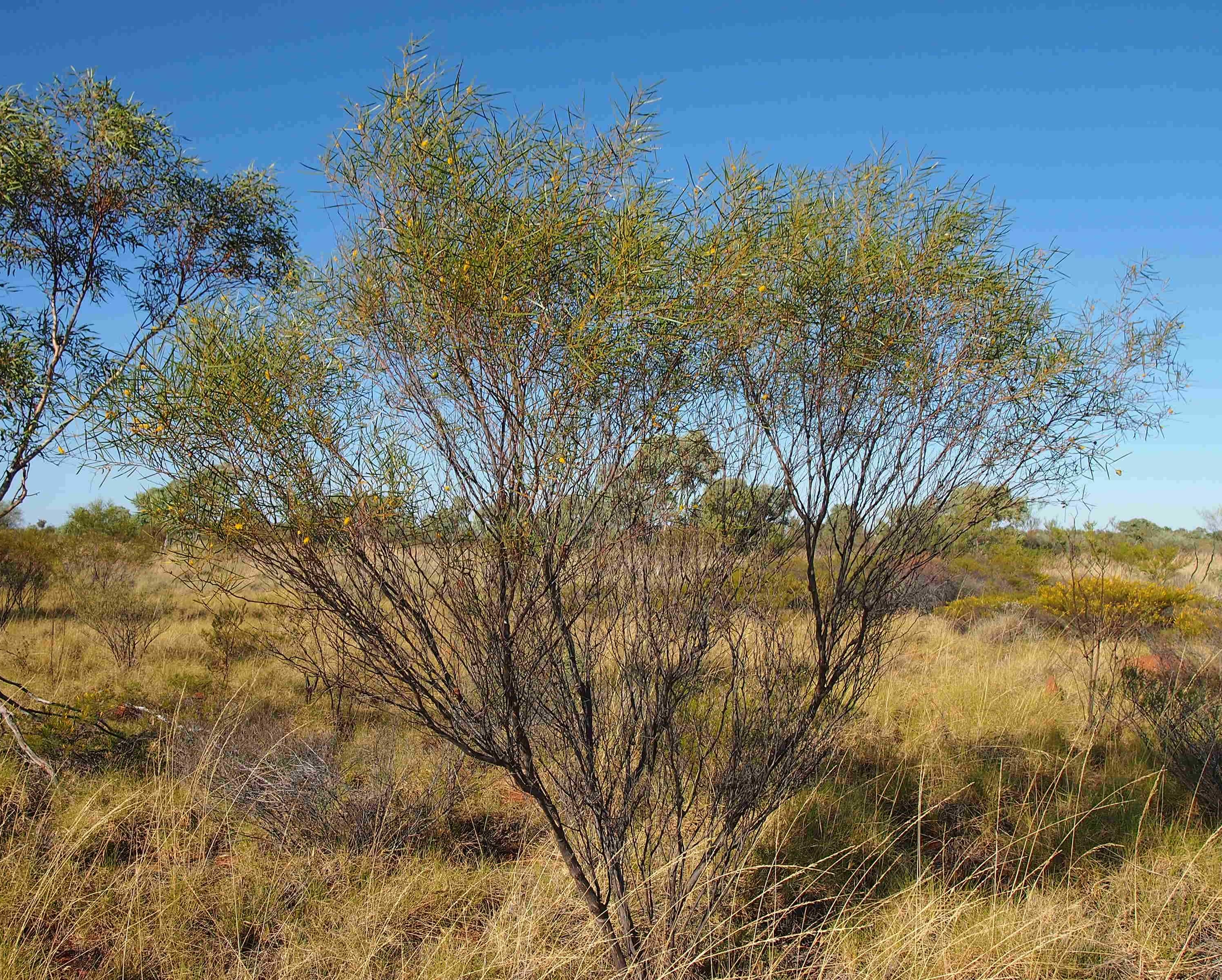
- Acacia ancistrocarpa habit

Conservation status
- Least Concern (IUCN 3.1)

Scientific classification
- Kingdom: Plantae
- Clade: Embryophytes
- Clade: Tracheophytes
- Clade: Spermatophytes
- Clade: Angiosperms
- Clade: Eudicots
- Clade: Rosids
- Order: Fabales
- Family: Fabaceae
- Subfamily: Caesalpinioideae
- Clade: Mimosoid clade
- Genus: Acacia
- Species: A. ancistrocarpa

Binomial name
- Acacia ancistrocarpa Maiden & Blakely
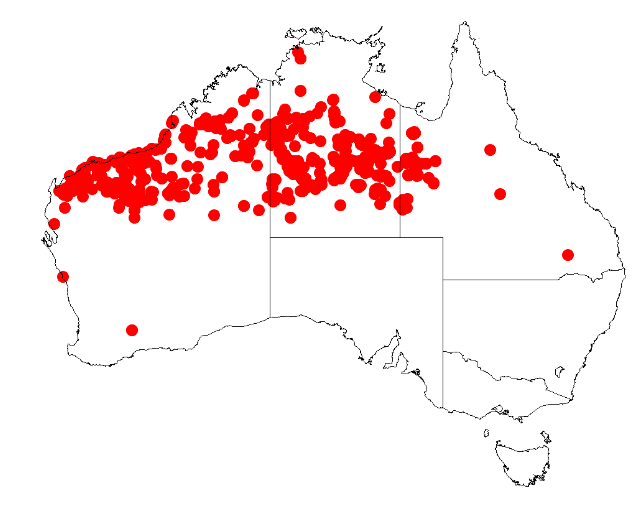
- Occurrence data from AVH

Synonyms
- Acacia pachycarpa F.Muell. ex Benth. p.p.; Racosperma ancistrocarpum (Maiden & Blakely) Pedley

= Acacia ancistrocarpa =

Species of legume

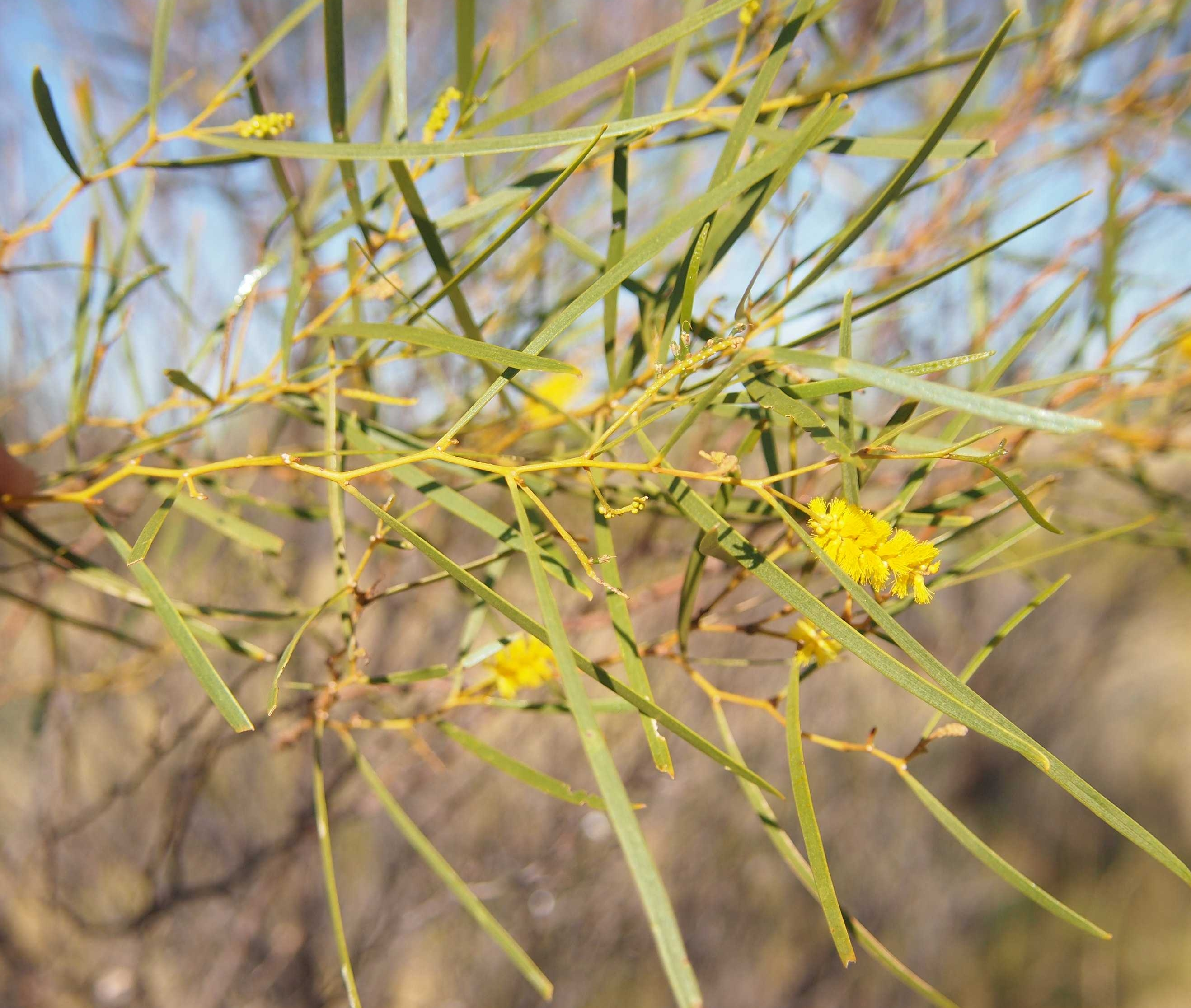
Foliage

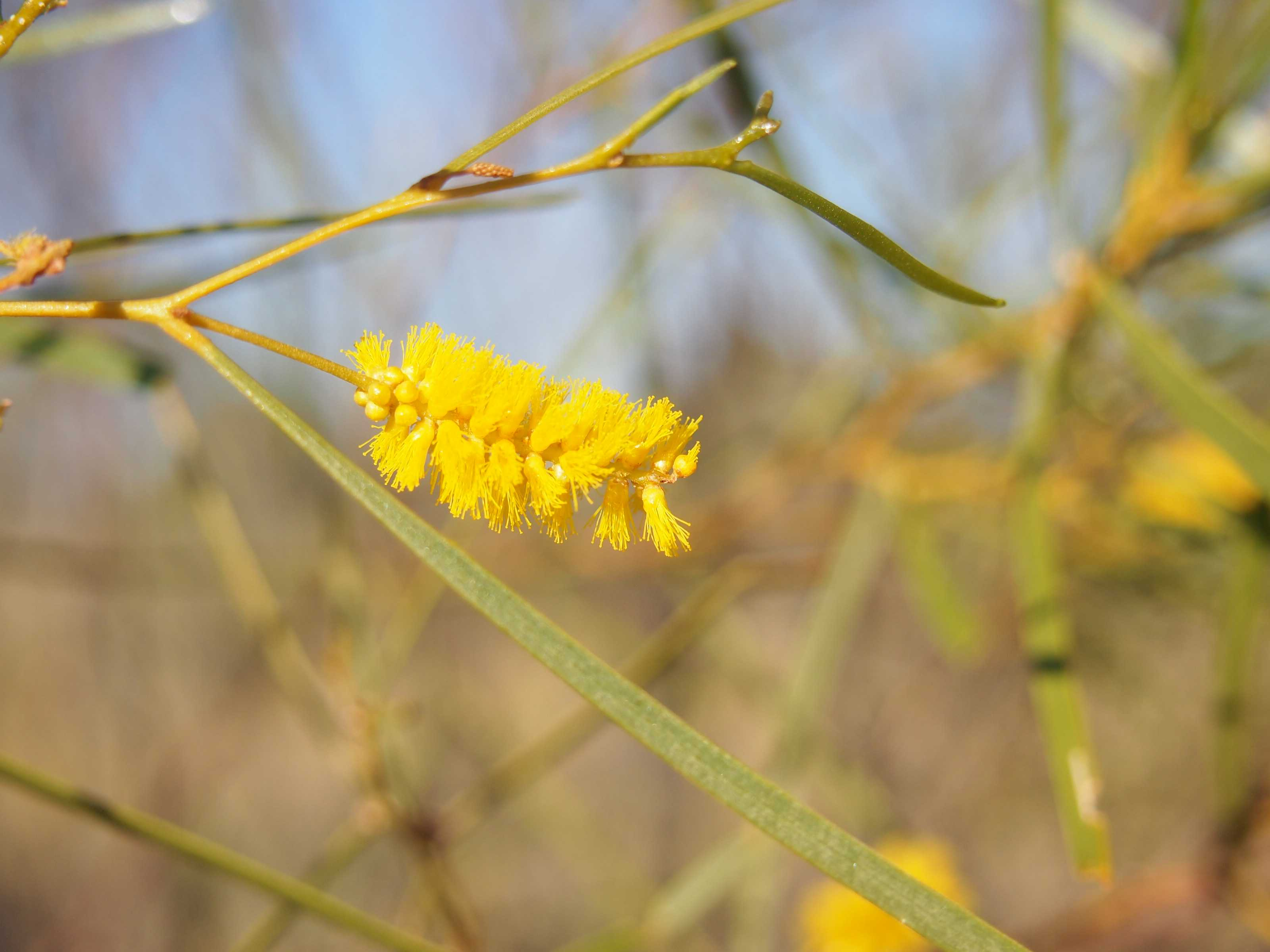
Flowers

Acacia ancistrocarpa, commonly known as Fitzroy wattle or pirrara, sometimes also fish hook wattle, pindan wattle or shiny leaved wattle, is a species of flowering plant in the family Fabaceae and is endemic to north-western Australia. The Walmajarri people of the Paruku IPA in the Kimberley call this wattle, kampuka. It is a multi-stemmed, fastigiate shrub, with linear or very narrow elliptic phyllodes, spikes of golden-yellow flowers, and narrowly oblong or cultrate pods up to 60–115 mm (2.4–4.5 in) long.

== Description ==
Acacia ancistrocarpa is a fastigiate, multi-stemmed, glabrous shrub or sometimes a tree, that typically grows to a height of up to 1.5–4 m (4 ft 11 in – 13 ft 1 in), with dark grey, longitudinally fissured bark on older specimens, the young shoots resinous. The phyllodes are bright olive green, linear to very narrowly elliptic, 60–180 mm (2.4–7.1 in) long and mostly 3–10 mm (0.12–0.39 in) wide. The flowers are golden-yellow and arranged in spikes 25–45 mm (0.98–1.77 in) long on a peduncle 5–15 mm (0.20–0.59 in) long, the flowers not particularly densely arranged along the spike. Flowering depends on rainfall, but often occurs between February and July, and the pods are narrowly oblong or cultrate, tapered at both ends, crust-like or almost woody, 60–115 mm (2.4–4.5 in) long and resinous. The seeds are broadly oblong to more or less egg-shaped, brownish black and 6–7 mm (0.24–0.28 in) long.

== Taxonomy ==
Acacia ancistrocarpa was first formally described in 1928 by the botanists Joseph Maiden and William Blakely in the Journal of the Royal Society of Western Australia. The specific epithet (ancistrocarpa) is taken from the Greek word ankistron meaning fish-hook and karpos meaning fruit referring to the hooked tip of the pod.

Acacia ancistrocarpa is known to form hybrids with Acacia trachycarpa.

== Distribution and habitat ==
Fitzroy wattle is widespread in the Northern Territory, the Pilbara and Kimberley regions and in far western Queensland. It usually grows in mallee-spinifex communities, stony spinifex grassland, pindan and along watercourses in deep sand on plains. Mostly it will not form dense stands but regenerates readily from seed after ground disturbances or bushfires and then can produce reasonably dense populations.

== See also ==
- List of Acacia species
