= Lerp (biology) =

Structure of crystallized honeydew

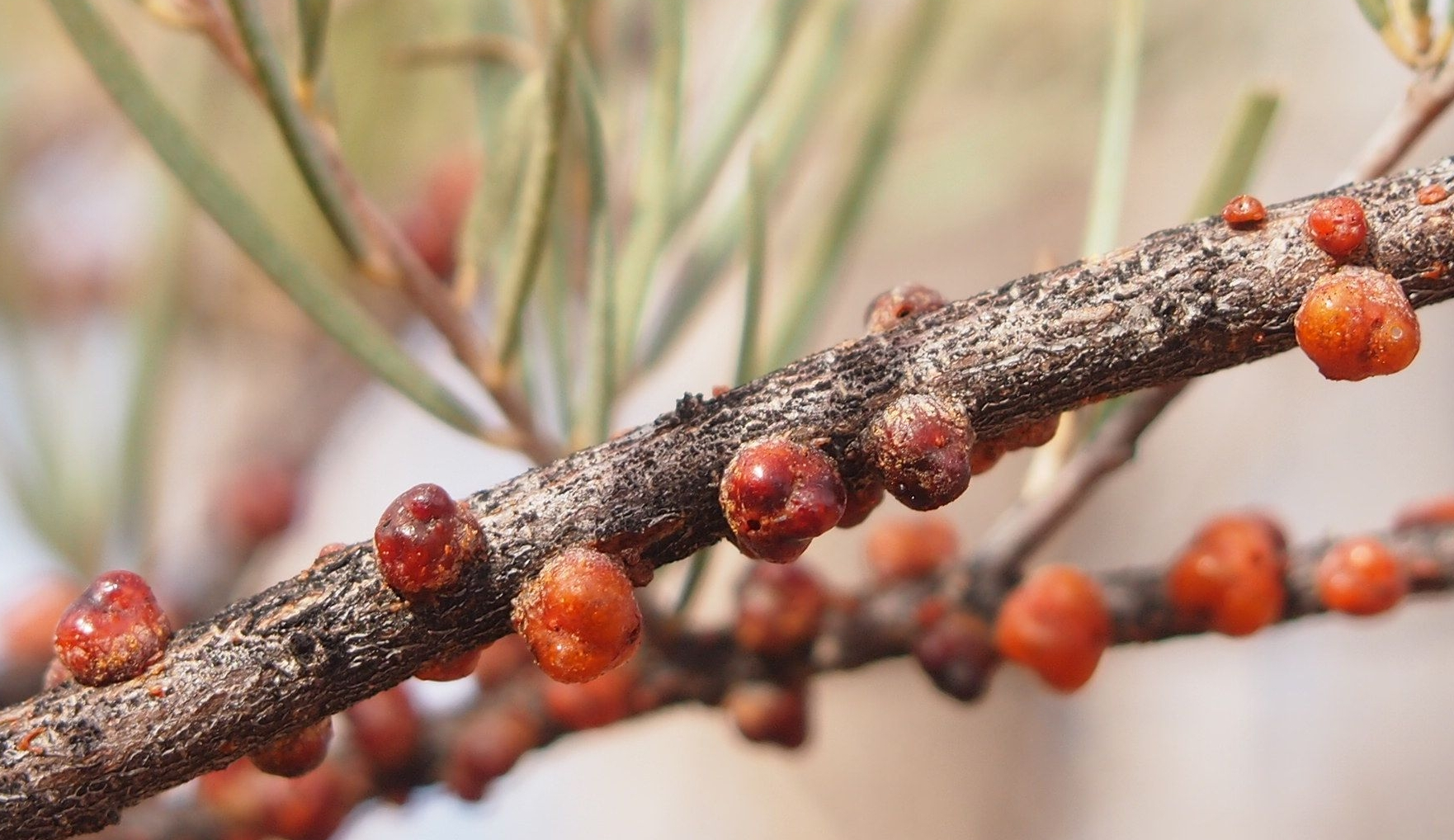
Red lerps (Austrochardia acaciae) on Acacia aneura, Central Australia

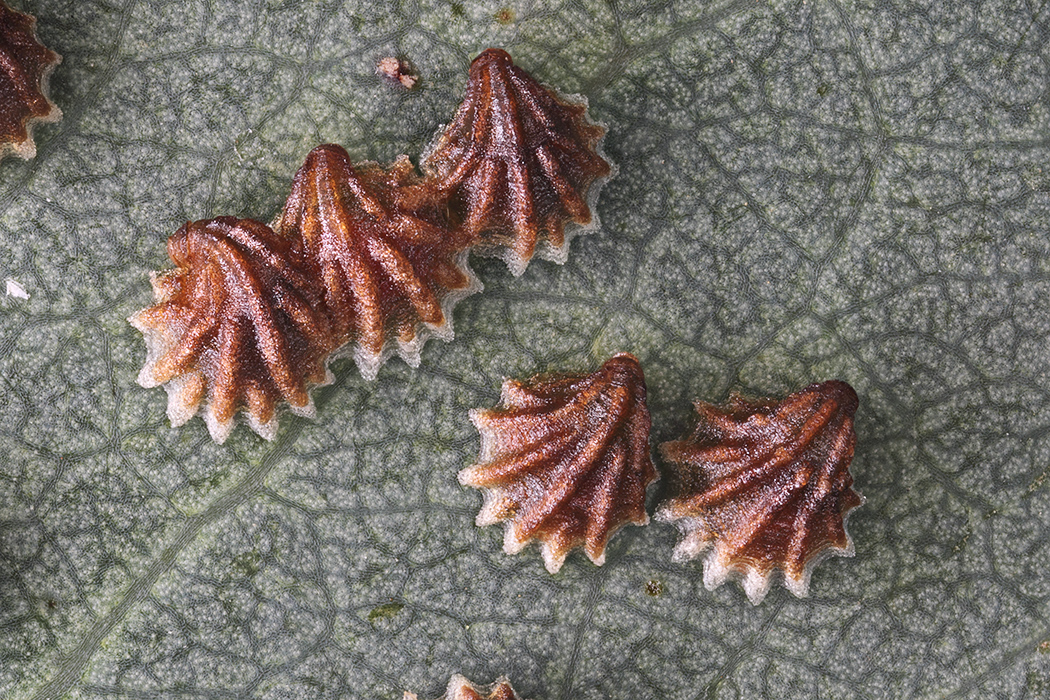
Close-up of several shell lerps on a leaf

In biology, a lerp is a structure of crystallized honeydew produced by larvae of psyllid bugs as a protective cover. These animals are commonly referred to as lerp insects, of which there are over 300 species in Australia.

Lerps are energy rich, consisting mostly of starch, with some proteins and fats. They are eaten by flying foxes, possums and birds such as pardalotes and honeyeaters.

The word is derived from the Wemba Wemba word lerep. Lerps are traditionally eaten by Indigenous people, and can be stored as dry balls for future use.

== See also ==
- Manna
