= Acacia tenuior =

Central Ranges wattle

Scientific classification
- Kingdom: Plantae
- Clade: Tracheophytes
- Clade: Angiosperms
- Clade: Eudicots
- Clade: Rosids
- Order: Fabales
- Family: Fabaceae
- Subfamily: Caesalpinioideae
- Clade: Mimosoid clade
- Genus: Acacia
- Species: A. tenuior

Binomial name
- Acacia tenuior Maiden

Species of legume

Acacia tenuior, commonly known as Central Ranges wattle, is a shrub of the genus Acacia and the subgenus Plurinerves that is endemic to a small area in central Australia. It is considered to be rare in South Australia.

== Description ==
The shrub typically grows to a maximum height of around 2 m (6 ft 7 in) and has prominently ribbed cylindrical branchlets that are usually haired and become glabrous with age and have quite prominent veins. Like most species of Acacia it has phyllodes rather than true leaves. The flexible, cylindrical to tapering and filiform phyllodes are straight to shallowly incurved with a length of 8 to 14 cm (3.1 to 5.5 in) and a diameter of around 1 mm (0.039 in) and have eight distant nerves that have deep grooves in between. When it blooms it produces simple inflorescences that occur singly or in pairs in the axils that have spherical flower-heads containing 25 to 30 yellow coloured flowers. Following flowering flat, leathery and sparsely haired seed pods are form that have a linear to narrowly oblong shape with a length of up to 10 cm (3.9 in) and a width of 6 to 8 mm (0.24 to 0.31 in) and contain longitudinally arranged seeds inside.

== Distribution ==
It is native to a small and scattered area in north western South Australia and south eastern Northern Territory including in the Musgrave Ranges including Ngarutjaranya and Jacky's Pass where the type specimen was collected by Herbert Basedow in 1903 and the Mann Ranges form around Mount Mann and usually at altitudes of about 1,200 m (3,900 ft) The shrubs are usually situated on areas of granite or gneiss often in gully heads and along drainage lines and usually along the southern sides of the slopes and in fire shadow areas.

== See also ==
- List of Acacia species
