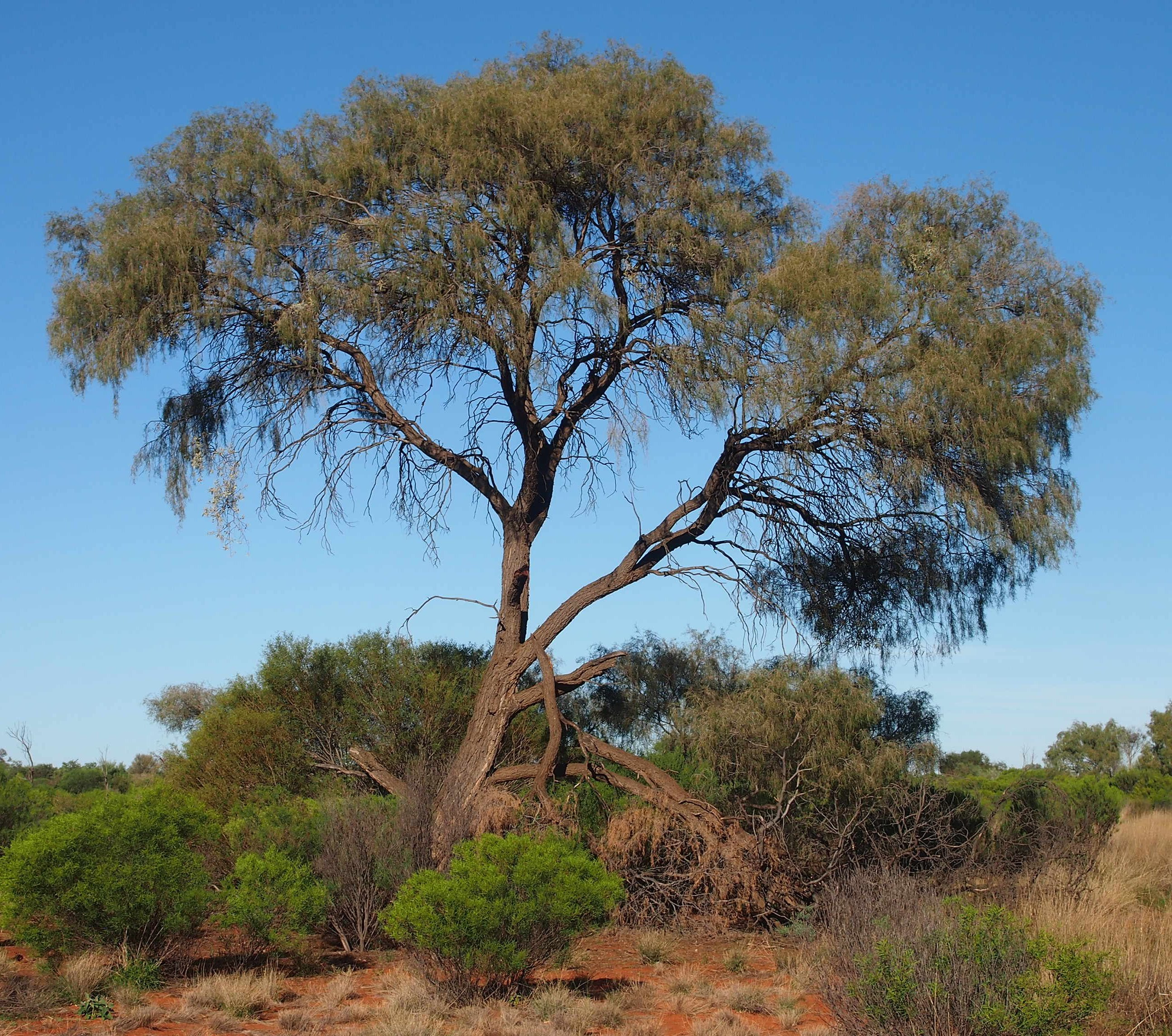

Conservation status
- Least Concern (IUCN 3.1)

Scientific classification
- Kingdom: Plantae
- Clade: Embryophytes
- Clade: Tracheophytes
- Clade: Spermatophytes
- Clade: Angiosperms
- Clade: Eudicots
- Clade: Rosids
- Order: Fabales
- Family: Fabaceae
- Subfamily: Caesalpinioideae
- Clade: Mimosoid clade
- Genus: Acacia
- Species: A. estrophiolata

Binomial name
- Acacia estrophiolata F.Muell.
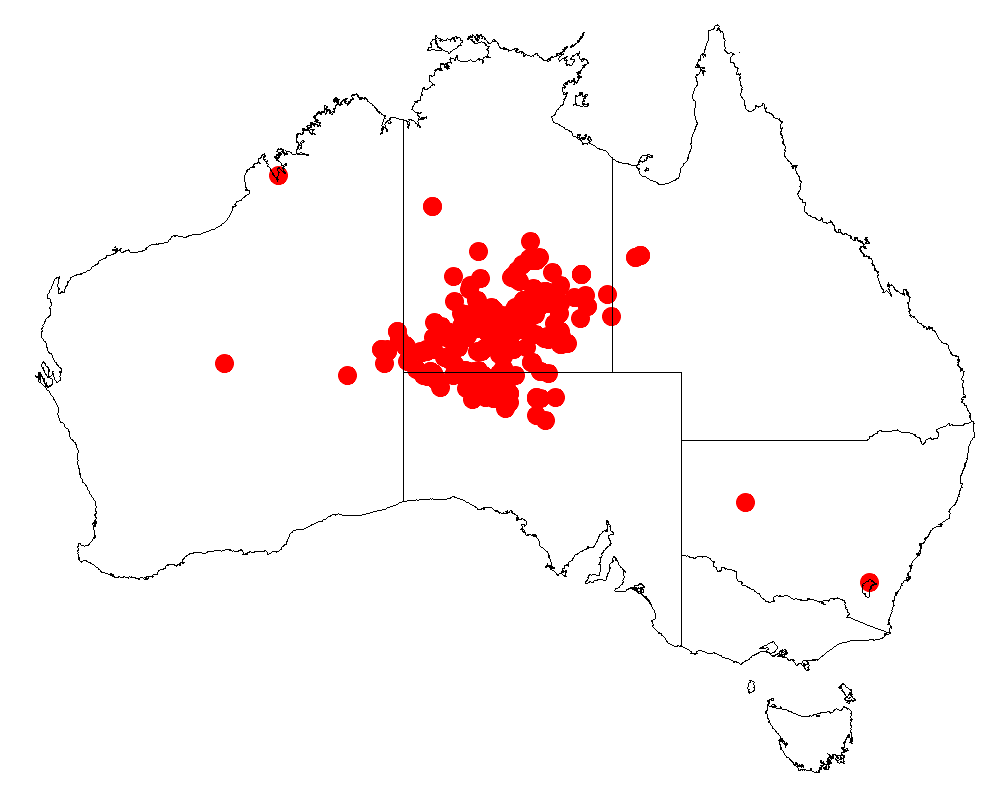
- Occurrence data from AVH

Synonyms
- Racosperma estrophiolatum (F.Muell.) Pedley

= Acacia estrophiolata =

Southern ironwood

Species of plant

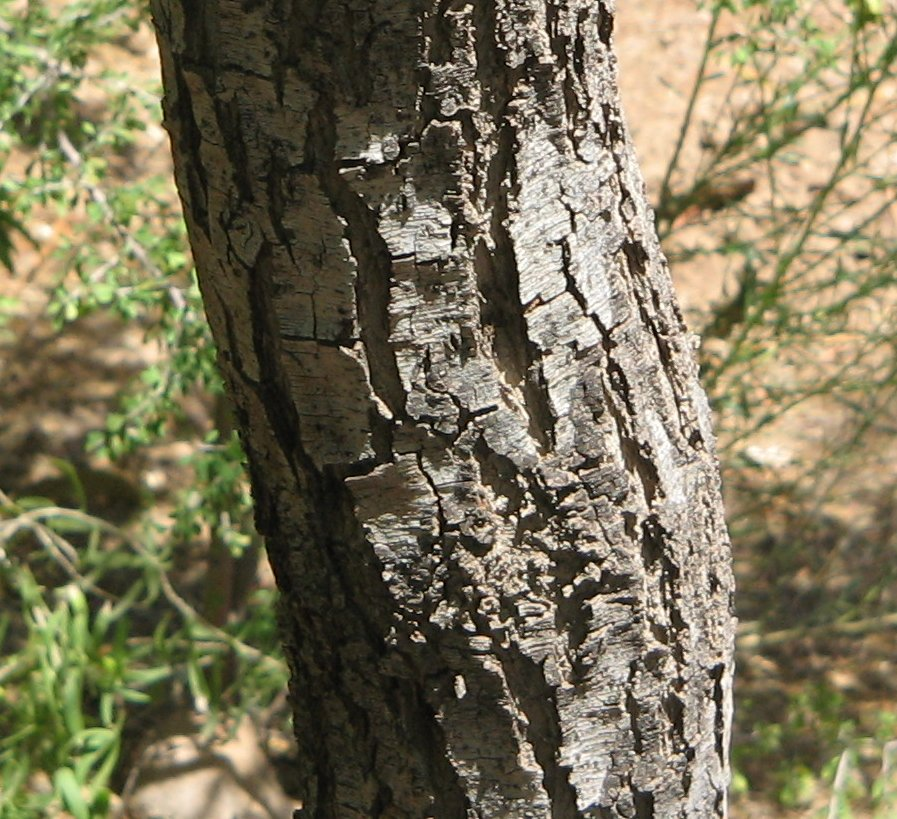
Bark

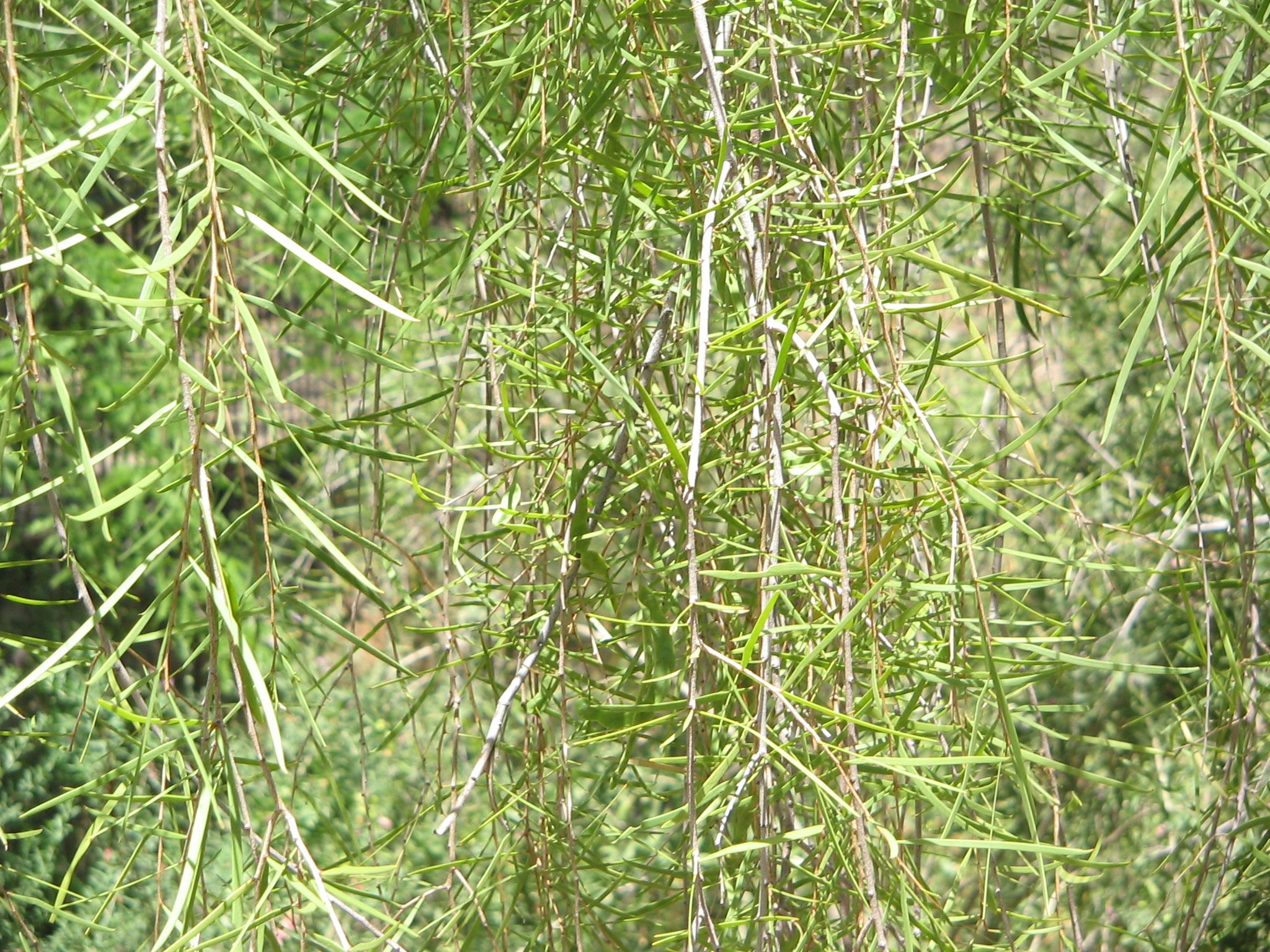
Foliage

Acacia estrophiolata, commonly known as ironwood, southern ironwood, desert ironwood or utjanypa, is a species of flowering plant in the family Fabaceae and is endemic to Central Australia. It is a graceful, glabrous tree with linear to very narrowly elliptic phyllodes, spherical heads of cream-coloured to pale yellow flowers, and firmly papery, flat pods.

== Description ==
Acacia estrophiolata is a graceful, glabrous tree that typically grows to a height of 4–16 m (13–52 ft) and has pendulous branchlets when mature. Its phyllodes are linear to very narrowly elliptic, straight to slightly curved, 40–110 mm (1.6–4.3 in) long and 2–5 mm (0.079–0.197 in) wide, thinly leathery pale green and glabrous with 3 or 4 main veins and a gland 4–10 mm (0.16–0.39 in) above the base of the phyllode. Its flowers are borne in one or two spherical heads in axils on a peduncle 5–12 mm (0.20–0.47 in) long. The heads are 4–5 mm (0.16–0.20 in) in diameter with 30 to 35 densely clustered, cream-coloured to pale yellow flowers.

== Taxonomy ==
Acacia estrophiolata was first formally described in 1882 by Ferdinand von Mueller in his Southern Science Record from specimens collected near the Finke River by Hermann Kempe.

It is closely related to Acacia excelsa and more distantly related to Acacia dolichophylla.

== Distribution and habitat ==
This species of wattle commonly grows on sandy alluvial flats as scattered trees, but also in tall open shrubland and open woodland. It is found in the Central Ranges, Finke, Great Victoria Desert and Stony Plains bioregions of South Australia, southern parts of the Northern Territory and the Central Ranges, Gascoyne, Great Sandy Desert and Tanami bioregions of Western Australia.

== Uses ==
=== Food ===
Traditionally, Aboriginal Australians would use the gum from the tree as a sweet bushtucker treat. Its name in the Arrernte language of Central Australia is Ngkwarle athenge arlperle. It is still sometimes eaten today. The gum is snapped off the branches, either clear or red. It is then ground and mixed with a little water, then left to set again to a chewable gum, and eaten with a small stick.

=== Forage ===
The tree makes good forage for livestock. The seeds are edible and are 28.9% protein.

=== Traditional medicine ===
Parts of the tree are used topically to treat skin problems such as burns, cuts, scabies, sores and it is also used for treating major wounds. It is used as a lotion to treat eye problems.

=== Wood ===
The wood is very hard and it is good for making posts for fences.

== See also ==
- List of Acacia species
