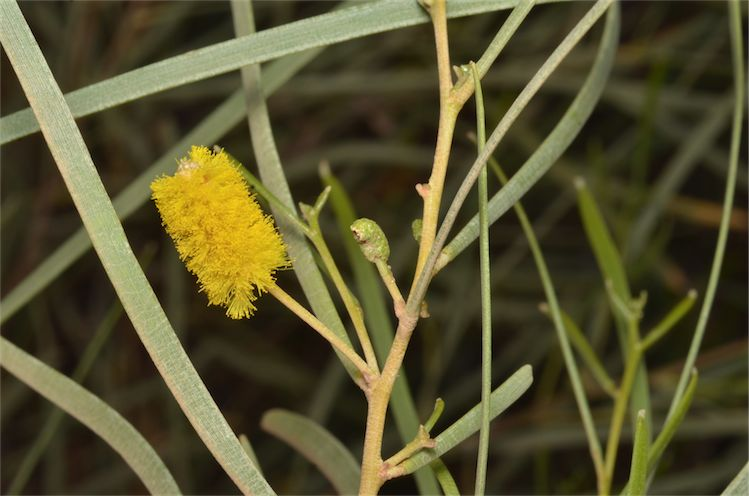
- On the Aramac Range

Conservation status
- Least Concern (IUCN 3.1)

Scientific classification
- Kingdom: Plantae
- Clade: Embryophytes
- Clade: Tracheophytes
- Clade: Spermatophytes
- Clade: Angiosperms
- Clade: Eudicots
- Clade: Rosids
- Order: Fabales
- Family: Fabaceae
- Subfamily: Caesalpinioideae
- Clade: Mimosoid clade
- Genus: Acacia
- Species: A. adsurgens

Binomial name
- Acacia adsurgens Maiden & Blakely
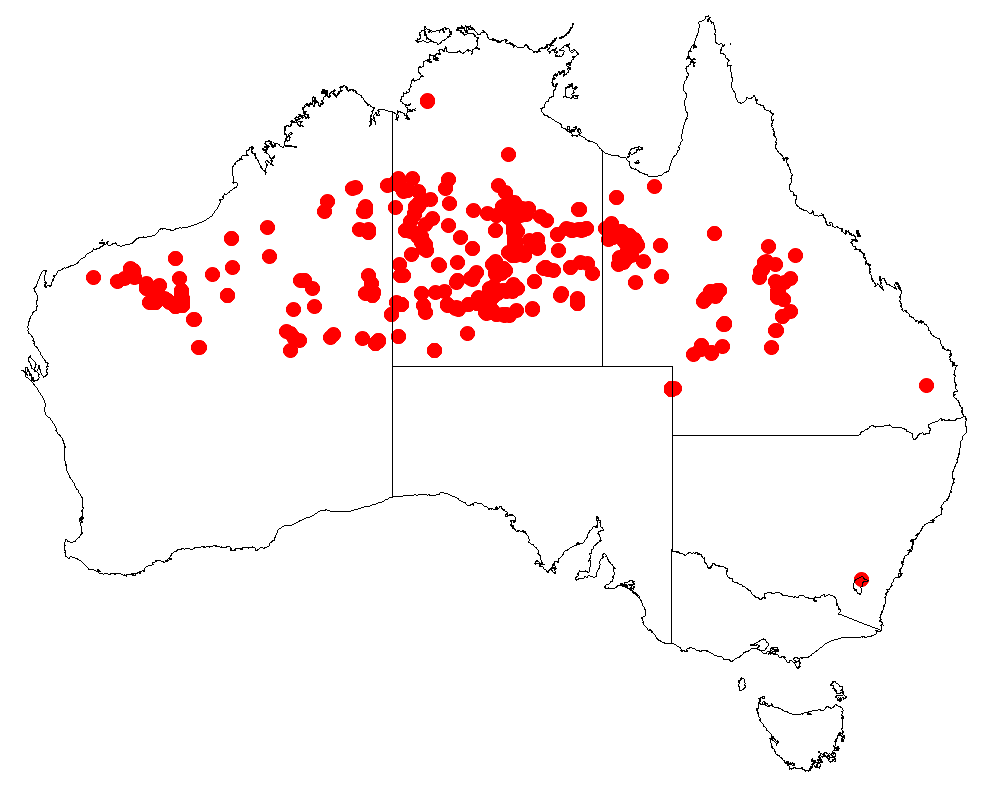
- Occurrence data from Australasian Virtual Herbarium

Synonyms
- Racosperma adsurgens (Maiden & Blakely) Pedley

= Acacia adsurgens =

Species of legume

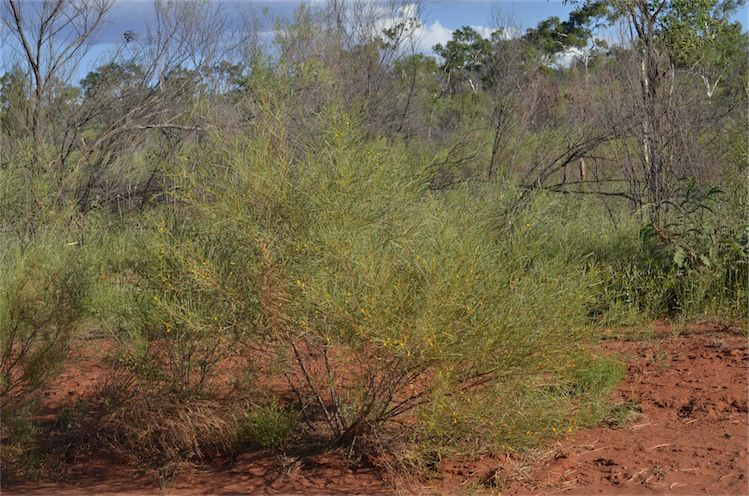
Habit

Acacia adsurgens, commonly known as whipstick wattle or sugar brother, is a species of flowering plant in the family Fabaceae and is endemic to northern areas of Australia. It is a spreading shrub with many stems, flat, linear phyllodes, densely-flowered spikes of yellow flowers, and linear, paper-like or crusty pods.

== Description ==
Acacia adsurgens is a spreading, multi-stemmed shrub that typically growing to a height of 1.5–4 m (4 ft 11 in – 13 ft 1 in) and has smooth, greyish-brown bark that splits to reveal reddish bark. It has flat, linear, straight or upwardly-curved phyllodes, mostly 100–180 mm (3.9–7.1 in) long and 2.0–4.5 mm (0.079–0.177 in) wide.

The flowers are arranged in densely-flowered, cylindrical spikes 8–25 mm (0.31–0.98 in) long on glabrous peduncles 5–15 mm (0.20–0.59 in) long. Flowering occurs from February or March to July, and the pods are linear, light brown, papery or crust-like, 35–120 mm (1.4–4.7 in) long and 2.0–3.5 mm (0.079–0.138 in) wide. The seeds are dark brown to blackish, 3.0–4.5 mm (0.12–0.18 in) long with a white to yellow or brownish aril.

== Taxonomy ==
Acacia adsurgens was first formally described in 1927 by the botanists Joseph Maiden and William Blakely in the Journal of the Royal Society of Western Australia.

== Distribution ==
Whipstick wattle is native to northern parts of Western Australia, central parts of the Northern Territory, parts of central Queensland and in far north east South Australia near Lake Eyre. The range extends from around Roebourne in the west through central Queensland in the east. It is found flat plains and hillsides growing in reddish sandy, loamy and gravelly soils and is usually part of spinifex grassland communities.

== See also ==
- List of Acacia species
