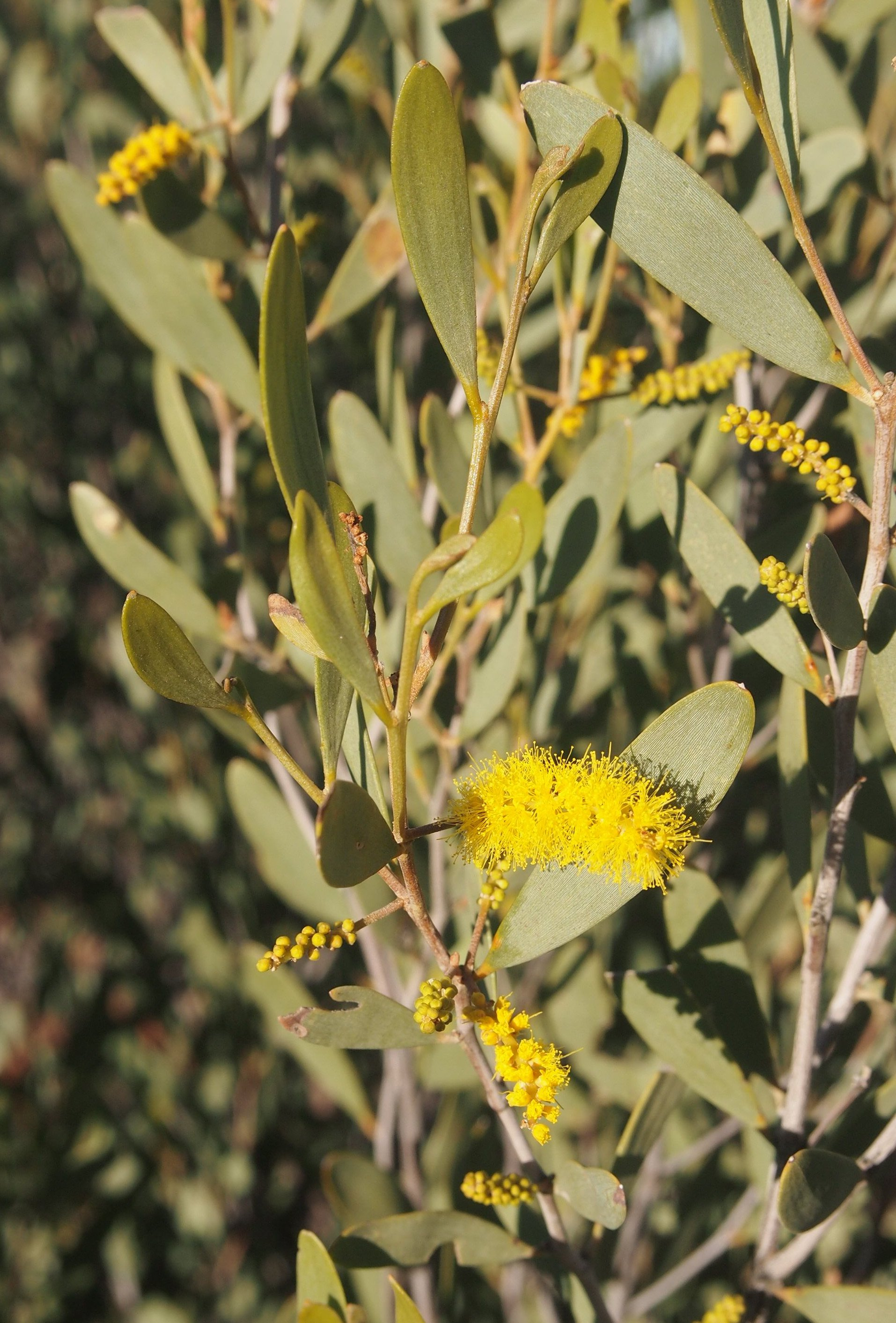
- Foliage and flowers

Scientific classification
- Kingdom: Plantae
- Clade: Embryophytes
- Clade: Tracheophytes
- Clade: Spermatophytes
- Clade: Angiosperms
- Clade: Eudicots
- Clade: Rosids
- Order: Fabales
- Family: Fabaceae
- Subfamily: Caesalpinioideae
- Clade: Mimosoid clade
- Genus: Acacia
- Species: A. kempeana

Binomial name
- Acacia kempeana F.Muell.
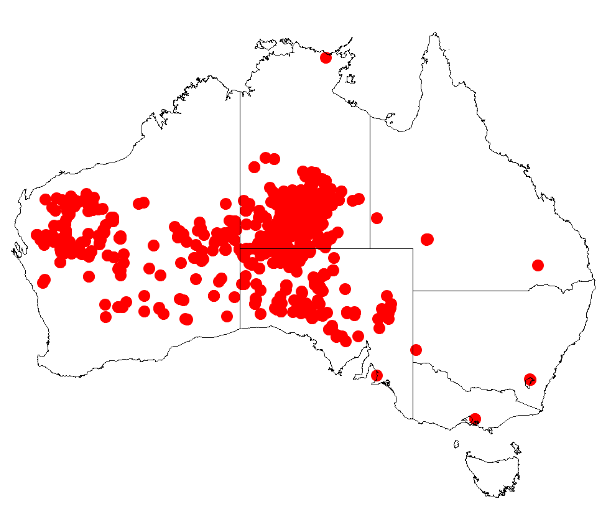
- Occurrence data from AVH

Synonyms
- Acacia sp. Pilbara (S.van Leeuwen 690) WA Herbarium: Racosperma kempeanum (F.Muell.) Pedley

= Acacia kempeana =

Wanderrie wattle

Species of plant

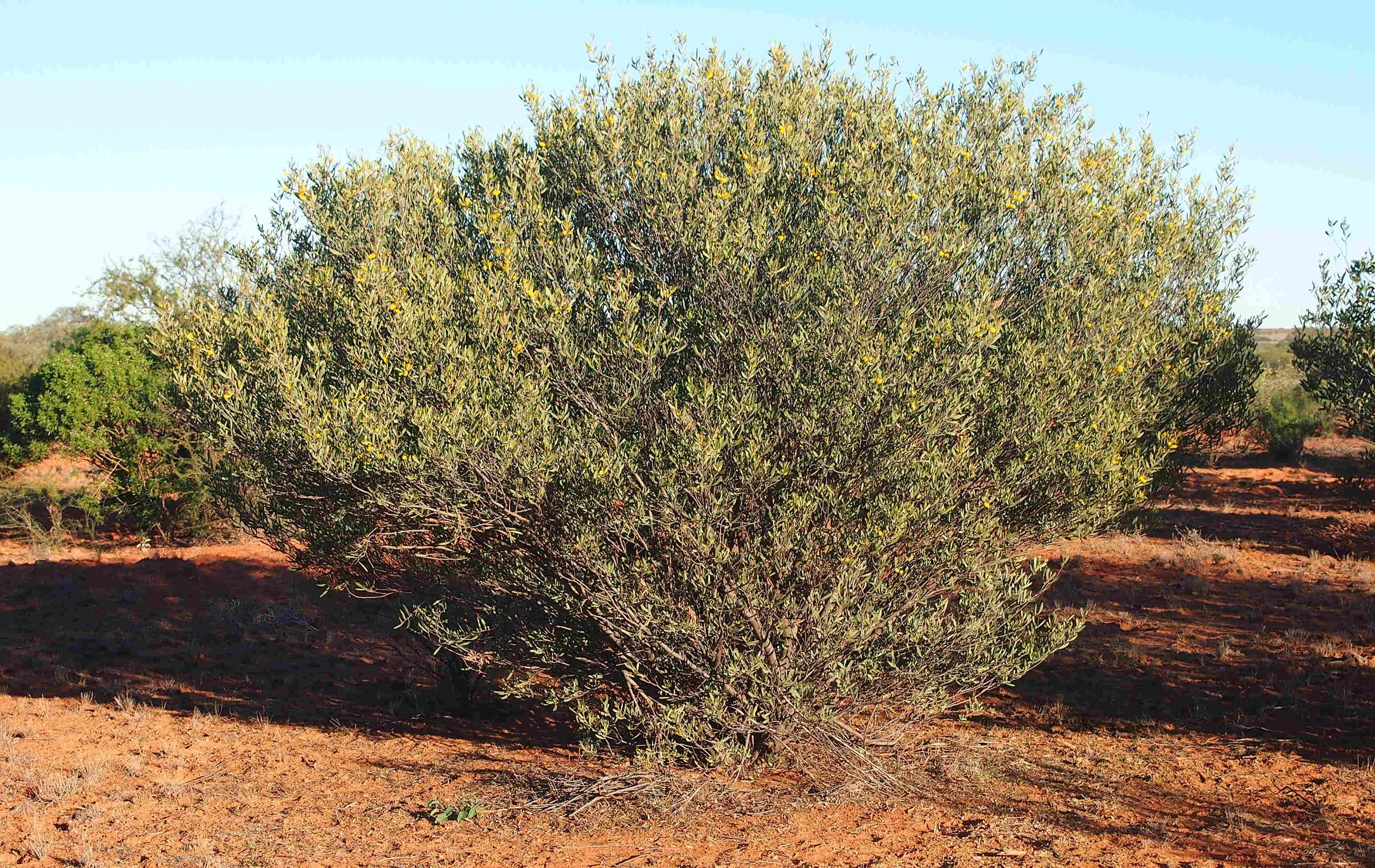
Habit

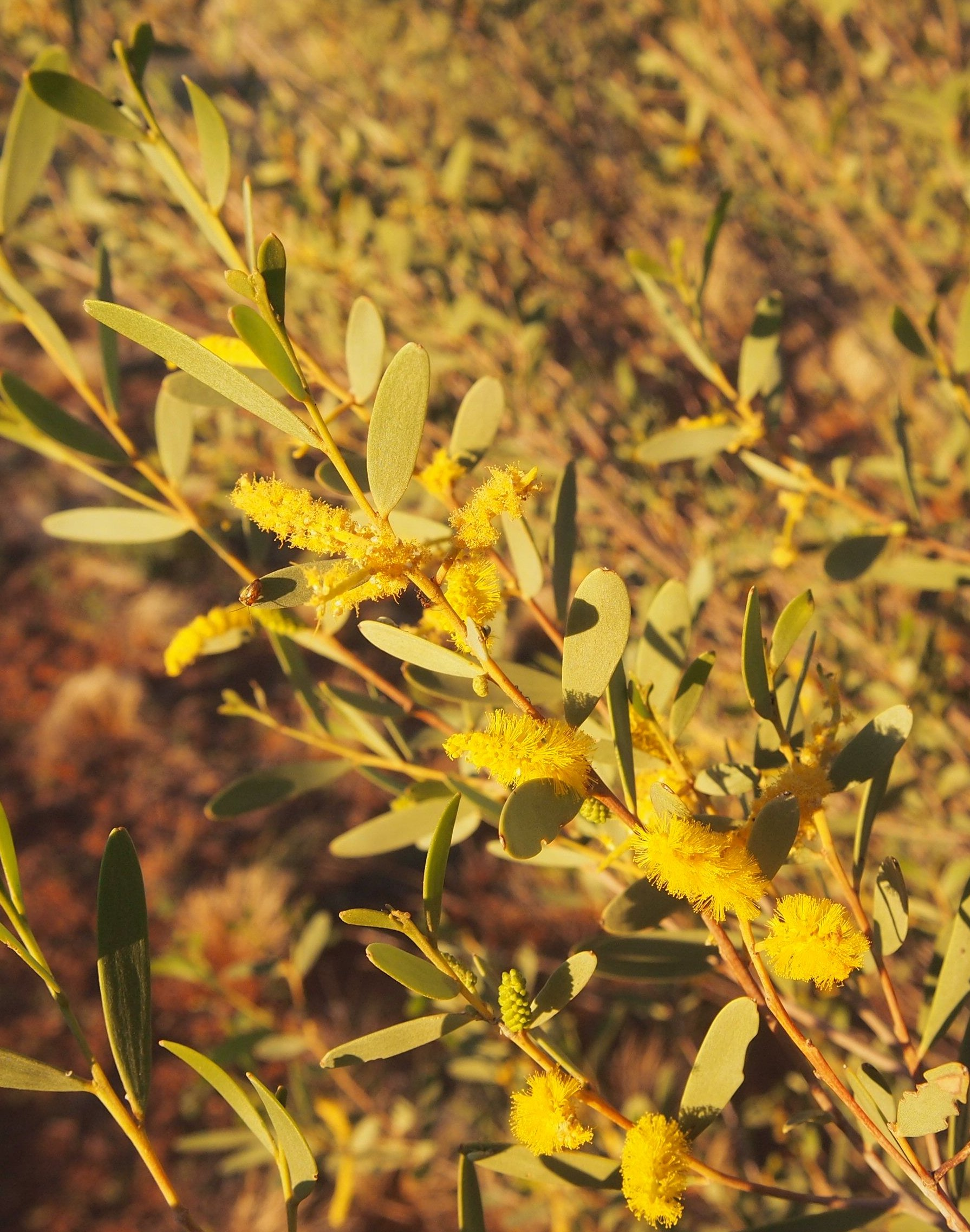
Inflorescences

Acacia kempeana commonly known as wanderrie wattle, witchetty bush or granite wattle, is a species of flowering plant in the family Fabaceae and is endemic to a arid parts of central and western Australia. It is a spreading shrub or tree with furrowed, grey or brown bark, leathery narrowly elliptic to narrowly lance-shaped phyllodes with the narrower end towards the base, one or two dense spikes of bright golden yellow flowers and leathery, oblong to narrowly oblong pods.

== Description ==
Acacia kempeana is spreading shrub or tree that typically grows to a height of up to 5 m (16 ft), rarely more, usually with grey or brown bark and terete, glabous branchlets. Its phyllodes are narrowly elliptic to very narrowly elliptic, sometimes narrowly lance-shaped with the narrower end towards the base, mostly 30–75 mm (1.2–3.0 in) long, 4–15 mm (0.16–0.59 in) wide and leathery with up to three veins slightly more prominent. The flowers are bright golden yellow, and densely arranged in one or two spikes in upper axils on glabrous peduncles 5–12 mm (0.20–0.47 in) long. Flowering occurs whenever temperature and soil moisture are high The pods are leathery, oblong to narrowly oblong, 20–70 mm (0.79–2.76 in) long, 1.0–1.6 mm (0.039–0.063 in) wide, glabrous and often slightly resinous.

== Taxonomy ==
Acacia kempeana was first formally described in 1882 by Ferdinand von Mueller in the Australasian Chemist and Druggist. The specific epithet (kempeana) honours the reverend Friedrich Adolph Hermann Kempe (1844–1928), co-founder of the Hermannsburg Mission, who sent about 600 plant specimens to Ferdinand von Mueller in Melbourne, including the type of A. kempeana which he gathered in 1879.

== Distribution and habitat ==
This species of wattle is widely distributed through arid and semi-arid areas of Western Australia, western South Australia, and the Northern Territory. It is grows in a variety of soils on stony hillsides, often in mulga woodland on red sandy loam plains.

== Uses ==
Witchetty grubs are a traditional staple food in arid regions. These larvae feed on the roots of the witchetty bush (for which they are named), as well as other Acacia species. The bush also provides edible gum and seeds.

== Use in horticulture ==
Acacia kempeana can be propagated from scarified seeds or seeds pre-treated in boiling water. It grows well in an open, sunny and reasonably well-drained position and is suitable for most soil types. It is a hardy species in dry and low maintenance areas, well noted for being both drought and frost tolerant.

== See also ==
- List of Acacia species
