= Acacia chrysella =

Scientific classification
- Kingdom: Plantae
- Clade: Tracheophytes
- Clade: Angiosperms
- Clade: Eudicots
- Clade: Rosids
- Order: Fabales
- Family: Fabaceae
- Subfamily: Caesalpinioideae
- Clade: Mimosoid clade
- Genus: Acacia
- Species: A. chrysella

Binomial name
- Acacia chrysella Maiden & Blakely
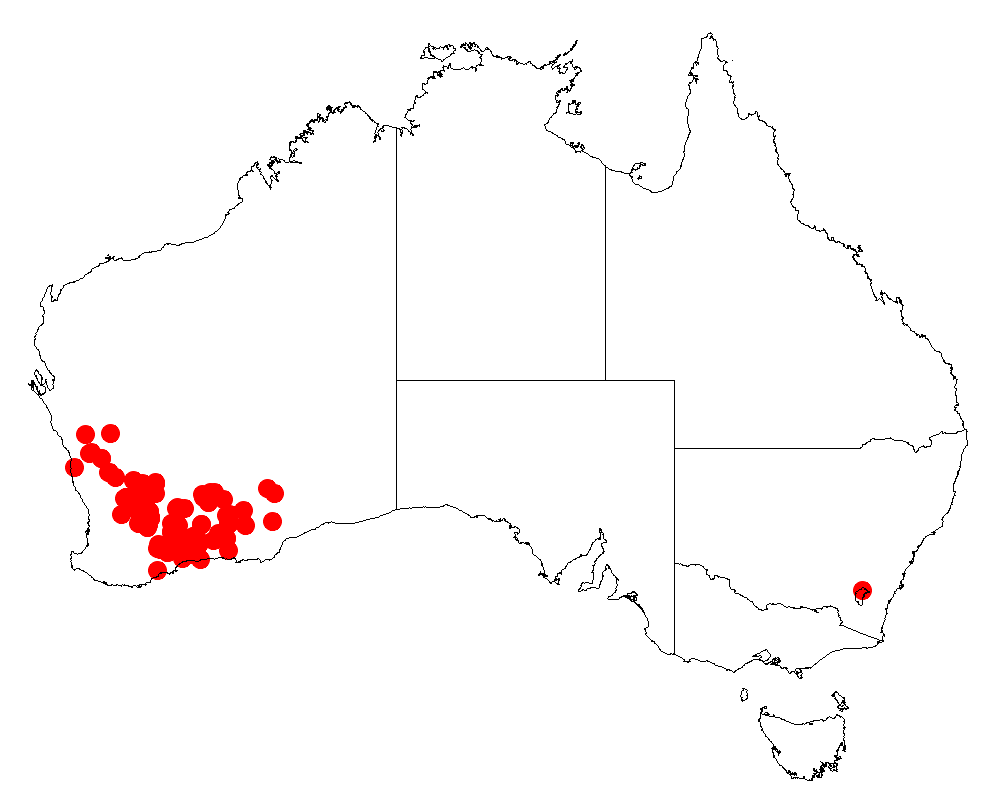
- Occurrence data from AVH

Synonyms
- Racosperma chrysellum (Maiden & Blakely) Pedley

Species of legume

Acacia chrysella is a species of flowering plant in the family Fabaceae and is endemic to the south-west of Western Australia. It is a shrub with many spreading branches, usually linear phyllodes, spherical heads of light golden yellow flowers and linear, thinly crust-like pods.

== Description ==
Acacia chrysella is a dense, bushy, rounded shrub with many branches and that typically grows to a height of up to 3.5 m (11 ft). Its branches and phyllodes are glabrous. The phyllodes are usually linear, occasionally narrowly lance-shaped with the narrower end towards the base, mostly 40–130 mm (1.6–5.1 in) long and 1–5.5 mm (0.039–0.217 in) wide and sometimes curved inwards. The flowers are borne in 3 to 10 spherical heads in racemes 4–20 mm (0.16–0.79 in) long on peduncles 2–4 mm (0.079–0.157 in) long, each head 2–3 mm (0.079–0.118 in) in diameter with 15 to 25 light golden yellow flowers. Flowering occurs from December to August, and the pods are linear, variably constricted between the seeds, thinly crust-like and glabrous, up to 100 mm (3.9 in) long and 5–6 mm (0.20–0.24 in) wide. The seeds are oblong or elliptic, 4–6 mm (0.16–0.24 in) long with a thick aril.

== Taxonomy ==
Acacia chrysella was first formally described in 1928 by the botanists Joseph Maiden and William Blakely in the Journal of the Royal Society of Western Australia from specimens growing on salmon (Eucalyptus salmonophloia) land and gimlet (Eucalyptus salubris) land 1 mi (1.6 km) from "Merredin State Farm, by Frederick Stoward in 1917. The specific epithet (chrysella) means 'little golden', referring to the tiny golden hairs on the flowers.

Acacia chrysella belongs to the Acacia microbotrya group and is most closely related to A. aestivalis, A. brumalis, A. chamaeleon and A. harveyi.

== Distribution ==
This species of wattle is found from near Cleary, south to Pingrup and east to near Coolgardie and Scaddan where it grows in sandy, loam or clay soils in the Avon Wheatbelt, Coolgardie, Esperance Plains, Mallee and Yalgoo bioregions of south-western Western Australia.

== Conservation status ==
Acacia chrysella is listed as "not threatened" by the Government of Western Australia Department of Biodiversity, Conservation and Attractions.

== See also ==
- List of Acacia species
