= Acacia daphnifolia =

Scientific classification
- Kingdom: Plantae
- Clade: Tracheophytes
- Clade: Angiosperms
- Clade: Eudicots
- Clade: Rosids
- Order: Fabales
- Family: Fabaceae
- Subfamily: Caesalpinioideae
- Clade: Mimosoid clade
- Genus: Acacia
- Species: A. daphnifolia

Binomial name
- Acacia daphnifolia Meisn.
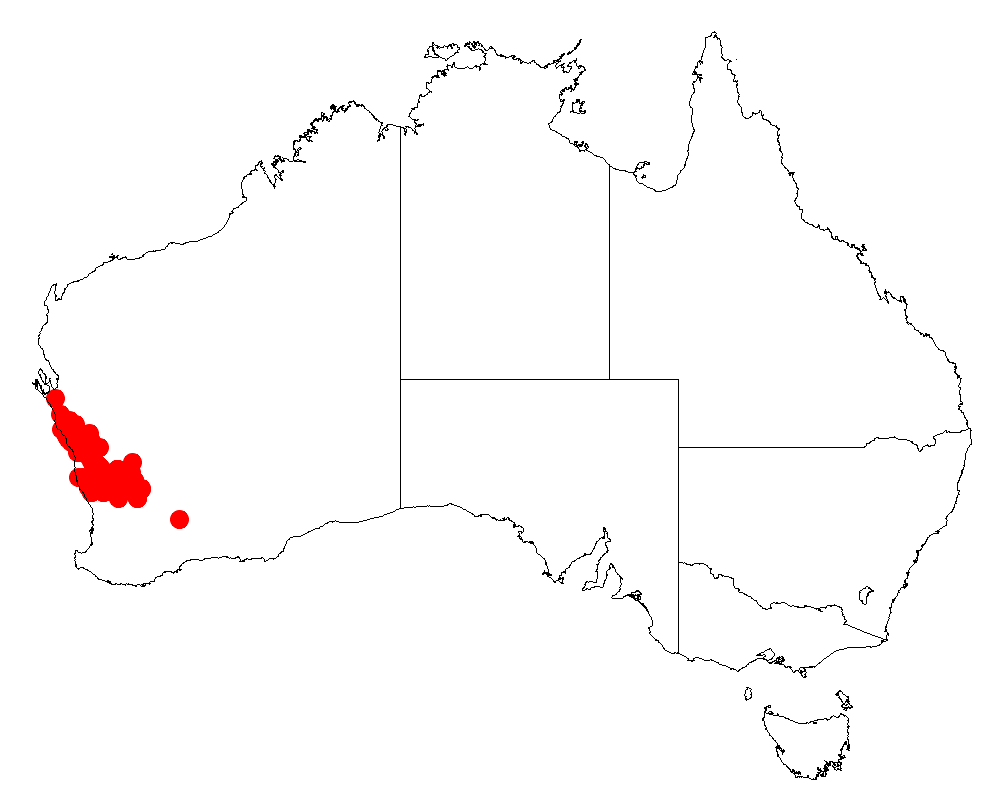
- Occurrence data from AVH

Synonyms
- Acacia subfalcata Meisn

Species of legume

Acacia daphnifolia, also known as northern manna gum, is a species of flowering plant in the family Fabaceae and is endemic to the south-west of Western Australia. It is a shrub or tree with mostly smooth grey bark, lance-shaped to narrowly elliptic or oblong phyllodes, spherical heads of fragrant, golden yellow flowers and thinly leathery pods resembling a string of beads.

== Description ==
Acacia daphnifolia is a shrub or tree that typically grows to a height of 2.5–4 m (8 ft 2 in – 13 ft 1 in) and has many stems. It often produces new individuals by root suckers. Its bark is mostly smooth and grey. The phyllodes are lance-shaped with the narrower end towards the base, to narrowly elliptic or sometimes oblong, straight to slightly curved, 60–100 mm (2.4–3.9 in) long, 6–15 mm (0.24–0.59 in) wide and thinly leathery with a single vein on each side.

The flowers are borne in spherical heads on peduncles 2–4 mm (0.079–0.157 in) long and covered with soft, light golden or silvery white hairs. The heads are 3–4 mm (0.12–0.16 in) in diameter with 17 to 30 showy, golden yellow, delicately fragrant flowers. Flowering occurs from late April to mid July, and the pods are dark brown to blackish and appearing somewhat like a string of beads, 80–200 mm (3.1–7.9 in) long, 7–9 mm (0.28–0.35 in) wide and thinly leathery. The seeds are oblong to elliptic, 7–9 mm (0.28–0.35 in) long and 5.0–5.5 mm (0.20–0.22 in) wide with a club-shaped aril.

== Taxonomy ==
Acacia daphnifolia was first formally described in 1855 by the botanist Carl Meissner in 1855 in the work Botanische Zeitung from specimens collected by James Drummond. The specific epithet (daphnifolia) means 'Daphne-leaved'.

This species is a member of the Acacia microbotrya group and is similar to A. amblyophylla and A. splendens.

== Distribution ==
This species of wattle grows in flat or undulating country, where it is often found in lower parts in water-gaining sites, commonly near granite, also often on degraded road verges, in sandy loam or clay-loam soils. It occurs from near Cataby, Watheroo and the Manmanning-Bencubbin area through Mullewa to near Ajana in the Avon Wheatbelt, Geraldton Sandplains, Mallee, Swan Coastal Plain and Yalgoo bioregions of south-western Western Australia.

== Conservation status ==
Acacia daphnifolia is listed as "not threatened" by the Government of Western Australia Department of Biodiversity, Conservation and Attractions.

== See also ==
- List of Acacia species
