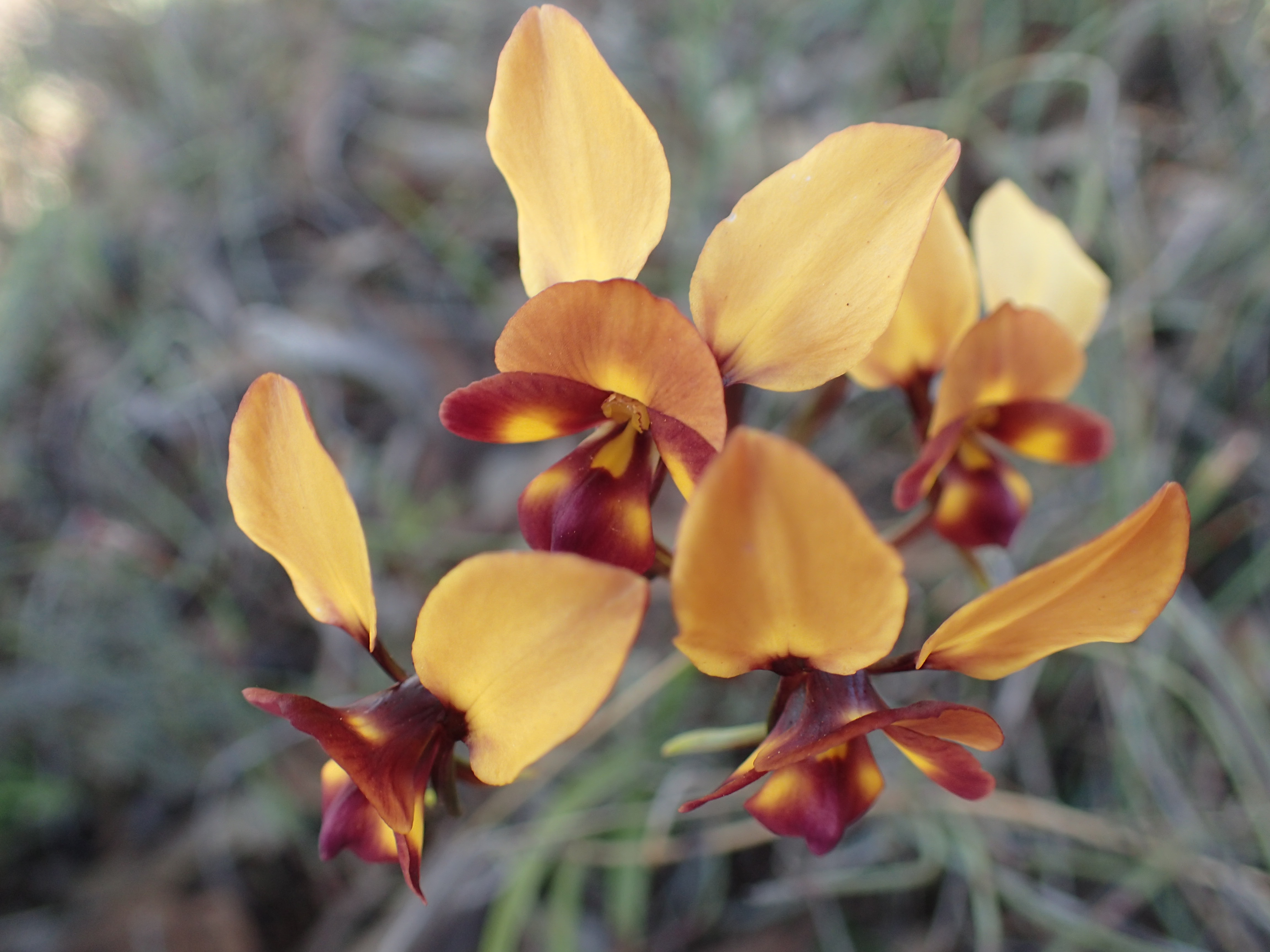
- Near Regans Ford

Scientific classification
- Kingdom: Plantae
- Clade: Tracheophytes
- Clade: Angiosperms
- Clade: Monocots
- Order: Asparagales
- Family: Orchidaceae
- Subfamily: Orchidoideae
- Tribe: Diurideae
- Genus: Diuris
- Species: D. tinkeri

Binomial name
- Diuris tinkeri D.L.Jones & C.J.French

= Diuris tinkeri =

Species of orchid

Diuris tinkeri, commonly known as Arrowsmith donkey orchid, is a species of orchid that is endemic to the south-west of Western Australia. It has two or three linear to lance-shaped leaves and up to seven yellow flowers suffused with reddish-purple to purple.

== Description ==
Diuris tinkeri is a tuberous, perennial herb with two or three linear to lance-shaped leaves 80–250 mm (3.1–9.8 in) long and 4–7 mm (0.16–0.28 in) wide. Up to seven yellow flowers suffused with reddish-purple to purple, 28–40 mm (1.1–1.6 in) long and 22–30 mm (0.87–1.18 in) wide are borne on a flowering stem 250–500 mm (9.8–19.7 in) tall. The dorsal sepal is egg-shaped, 10–13 mm (0.39–0.51 in) long and 12–16 mm (0.47–0.63 in) wide, the lateral sepals narrowly oblong and crossed, 15–22 mm (0.59–0.87 in) long and 2.5–3.5 mm (0.098–0.138 in) wide. The petal blades are broadly elliptic, 12–18 mm (0.47–0.71 in) long and 9–13 mm (0.35–0.51 in) wide on a reddish-brown stalk 3–5 mm (0.12–0.20 in) long. The labellum is 8–12 mm (0.31–0.47 in) long with three lobes - the middle lobe wedge-shaped, 8–12 mm (0.31–0.47 in) long and 8–11 mm (0.31–0.43 in) wide, the side lobes spread widely apart and oblong, 8–10 mm (0.31–0.39 in) long and 4–6 mm (0.16–0.24 in) wide. There is a single smooth, yellow callus ridge 4–6 mm (0.16–0.24 in) long, along the mid-line of the labellum. Flowering occurs from mid-August to early October.

== Taxonomy and naming ==
Diuris tinkeri was first formally described in 2013 by David Jones and Christopher J. French in Australian Orchid Review, from a specimen collected in the Western Flora Caravan Park near Eneabba in 1997. The specific epithet (tinkeri) honours Allan Tinker, who recognised the distinctiveness of the species.

== Distribution and habitat ==
Arrowsmith donkey orchid grows in woodland, shrubland and kwongan in near-coastal areas, from near Geraldton to near Yanchep in the Geraldton Sandplains, Jarrah Forest and Swan Coastal Plain bioregions of south-western Western Australia.

== Conservation ==
Diuris tinkeri is listed as "not threatened" by the Western Australian Government Department of Biodiversity, Conservation and Attractions.
