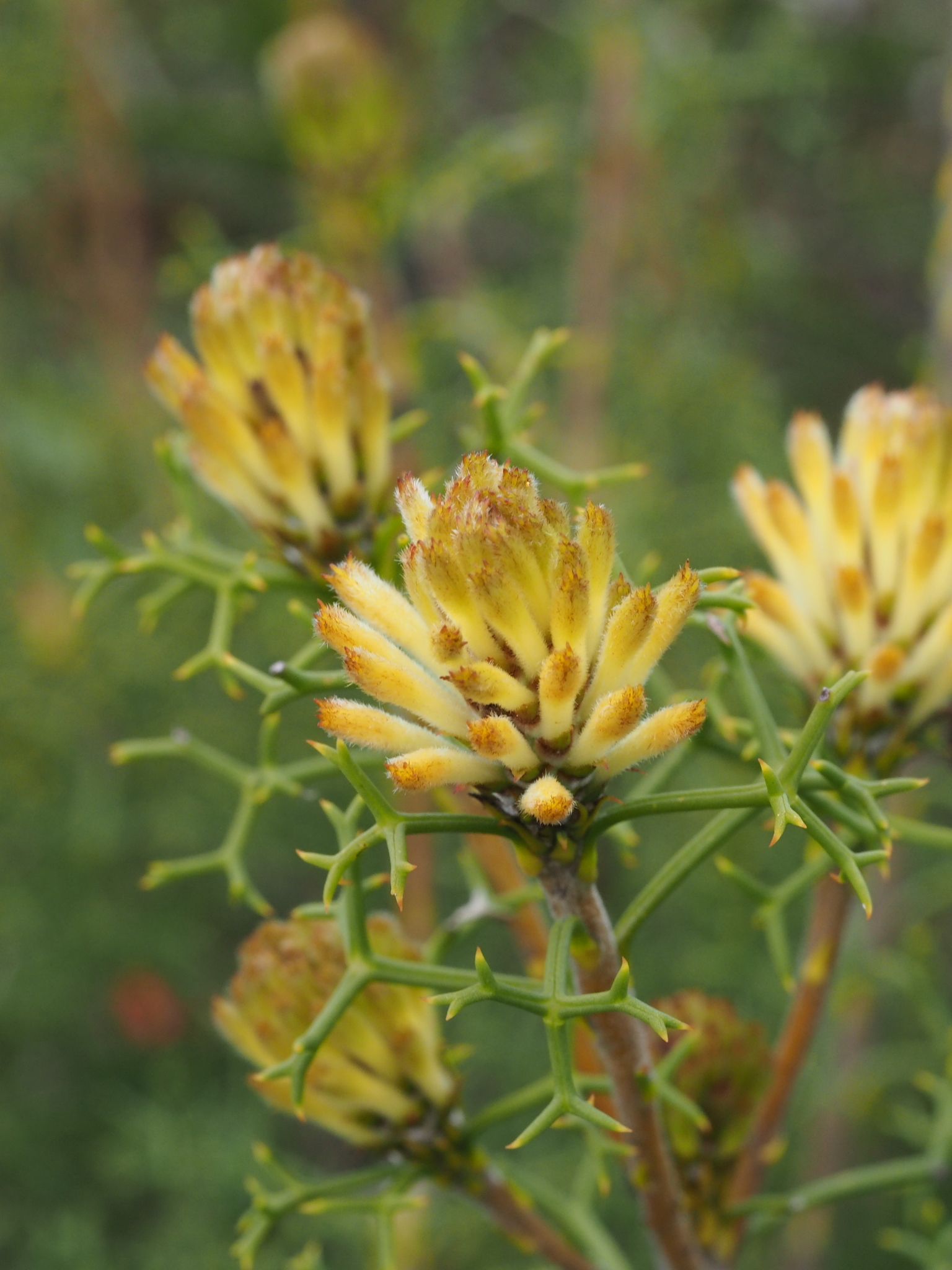
- Near Redmond

Scientific classification
- Kingdom: Plantae
- Clade: Tracheophytes
- Clade: Angiosperms
- Clade: Eudicots
- Order: Proteales
- Family: Proteaceae
- Genus: Petrophile
- Species: P. rigida

Binomial name
- Petrophile rigida R.Br.

Synonyms
- Protea rigida (R.Br.) Poir. nom. inval., nom. nud.

= Petrophile rigida =

Species of shrub endemic to Western Australia

Petrophile rigida is a species of flowering plant in the family Proteaceae and is endemic to southwestern Western Australia. It is a shrub with rigid, branched, needle-shaped, sharply-pointed leaves, and more or less spherical heads of hairy yellow flowers.

== Description ==
Petrophile rigida is a widely-branched shrub that typically grows to a height of 0.3–1.5 m (1 ft 0 in – 4 ft 11 in) and has glabrous branchlets. The leaves are pinnately-divided, 30–85 mm (1.2–3.3 in) long on a petiole 12–34 mm (0.47–1.34 in) long, with mostly sixteen to eighteen needle-shaped, sharply-pointed lobes usually 1–2 mm (0.039–0.079 in) long but sometimes up to 25 mm (0.98 in) long. The flowers are arranged on the ends of branchlets and in leaf axils in sessile, more or less spherical heads about 25 mm (0.98 in) in diameter, with lance-shaped involucral bracts at the base. The flowers are about 15 mm (0.59 in) long, cream-coloured with a yellow tip and hairy. Flowering mainly occurs from September to October and the fruit is a nut, fused with others in a spherical head up to about 20 mm (0.79 in) in diameter.

== Taxonomy ==
Petrophile rigida was first formally described in 1810 by Robert Brown in Transactions of the Linnean Society of London. The specific epithet (rigida) refers to the leaves.

== Distribution and habitat ==
Petrophile rigida grows in sandy heath with Banksia and Nuytsia species in scattered populations between Regans Ford, the Stirling Range and the Fitzgerald River National Park.

== Conservation status ==
This petrophile is classified as "not threatened" by the Western Australian Government Department of Parks and Wildlife.
