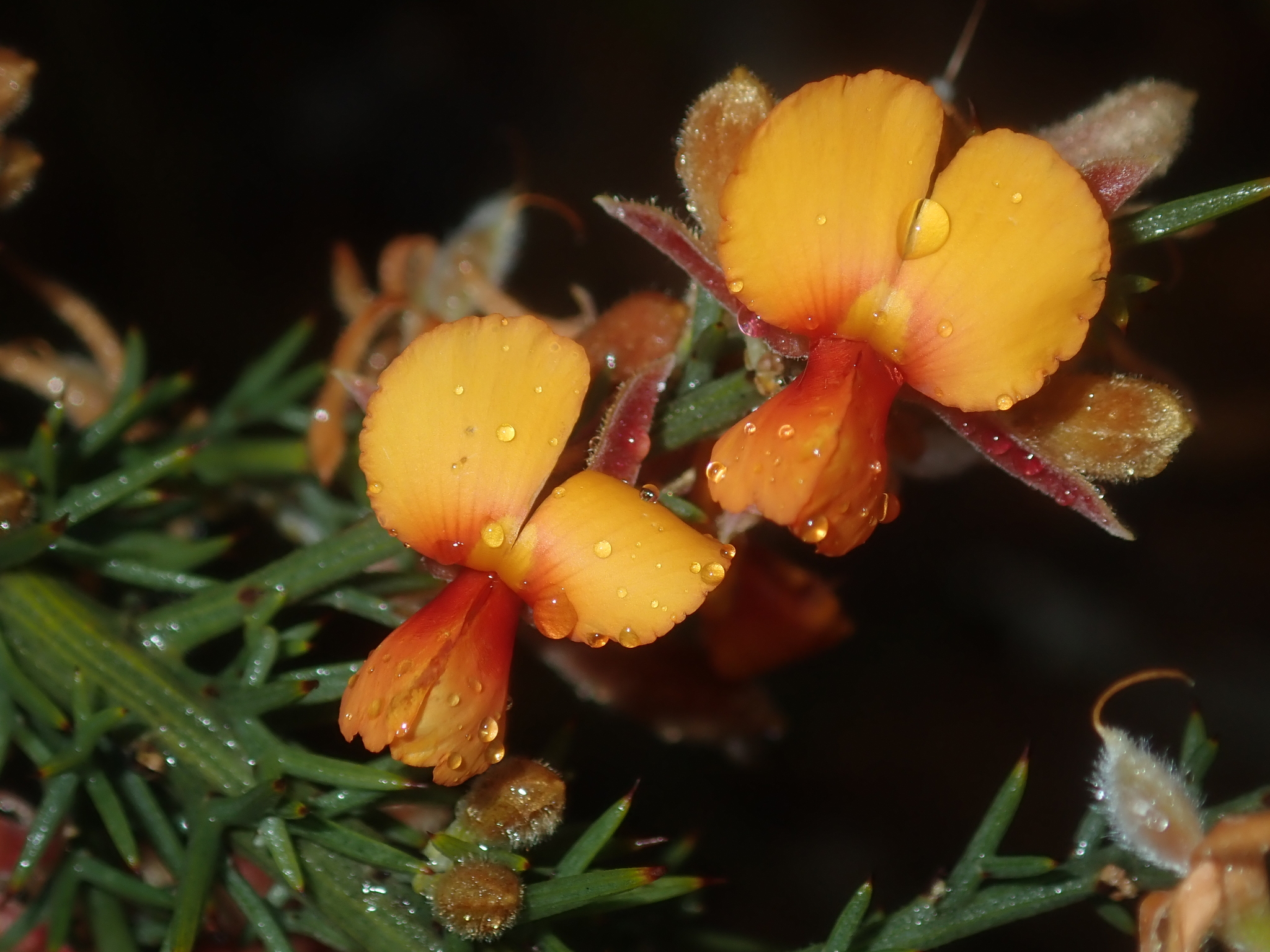
- In the Australian National Botanic Gardens

Scientific classification
- Kingdom: Plantae
- Clade: Tracheophytes
- Clade: Angiosperms
- Clade: Eudicots
- Clade: Rosids
- Order: Fabales
- Family: Fabaceae
- Subfamily: Faboideae
- Genus: Jacksonia
- Species: J. hakeoides

Binomial name
- Jacksonia hakeoides Meisn.

= Jacksonia hakeoides =

Species of legume

Jacksonia hakeoides is a species of flowering plant in the family Fabaceae and is endemic to the south west of Western Australia. It is a low, densely-branched shrub with sharply-pointed end branches, the leaves reduced to scales, yellow-orange to orange flowers with red markings, and woody, densely hairy pods.

== Description ==
Jacksonia hakeoides is a low, densely-branched, sturdy shrub that typically grows up to 0.2–1.5 m (7.9 in – 4 ft 11.1 in) high and 0.4–2 m (1 ft 4 in – 6 ft 7 in) wide, its branches greyish green. Its end branches are sharply-pointed, 1.2–6.9 mm (0.047–0.272 in) long and about 1.5 mm (0.059 in) wide with spreading, white hairs. The leaves are reduced to reddish-brown, egg-shaped scales, 0.4–2.5 mm (0.016–0.098 in) long and 0.4–1.6 mm (0.016–0.063 in) wide. The flowers are scattered along the branches on a straight pedicel 2.2–5.5 mm (0.087–0.217 in) long. There are egg-shaped bracteoles with irregularly toothed edges, 1.2–1.5 mm (0.047–0.059 in) long and 0.6–0.9 mm (0.024–0.035 in) wide on the pedicels. The floral tube is 0.8–1.9 mm (0.031–0.075 in) long and the sepals are membranous, the lobes 5.8–10.3 mm (0.23–0.41 in) long, 1.0–2.2 mm (0.039–0.087 in) wide and fused at the base for 0.7–1.1 mm (0.028–0.043 in). The standard petal is yellow-orange to orange with red markings, 7.4–8.5 mm (0.29–0.33 in) long and 8.3–11 mm (0.33–0.43 in) deep, the wings yellow-orange to orange with red markings, 7.6–9.1 mm (0.30–0.36 in) long, and the keel is red, 7.6–9.1 mm (0.30–0.36 in) long. The filaments of the stamens are red, 4–9.7 mm (0.16–0.38 in) long. Flowering occurs from May to December, and the fruit is a woody, densely hairy, broadly elliptic pod, 5–8 mm (0.20–0.31 in) long and 3.2–4 mm (0.13–0.16 in) wide.

== Taxonomy ==
Jacksonia hakeoides was first formally described in 1853 by Carl Meissner Lehmann's Plantae Preissianae from specimens collected by James Drummond in the Swan River Colony. The specific epithet (hakeoides) means 'Hakea-like'.

== Distribution and habitat ==
This species of Jacksonia grows in sand or limestone in heathland or woodland between Ajana, Regans Ford and Calingiri in the Avon Wheatbelt, Geraldton Sandplains, Jarrah Forest, Swan Coastal Plain and Yalgoo bioregions of south-western Western Australia.

== Conservation status ==
Jacksonia hakeoides is listed as "not threatened" by the Government of Western Australia Department of Biodiversity, Conservation and Attractions.
