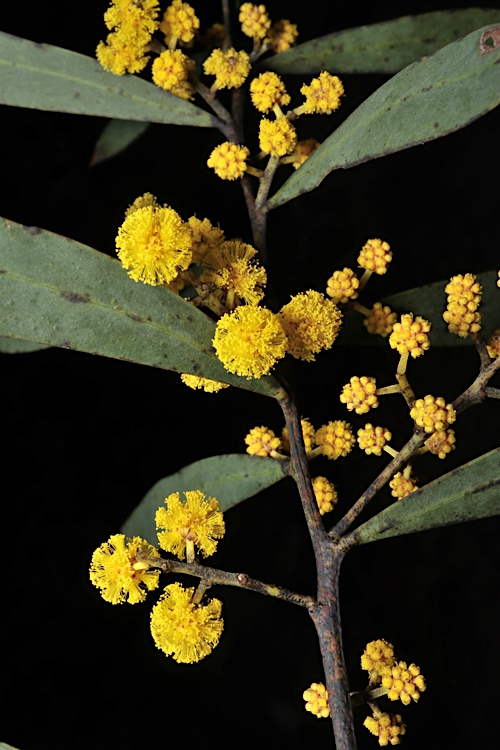
- In the Australian National Botanic Gardens

Scientific classification
- Kingdom: Plantae
- Clade: Tracheophytes
- Clade: Angiosperms
- Clade: Eudicots
- Clade: Rosids
- Order: Fabales
- Family: Fabaceae
- Subfamily: Caesalpinioideae
- Clade: Mimosoid clade
- Genus: Acacia
- Species: A. brumalis

Binomial name
- Acacia brumalis Maslin
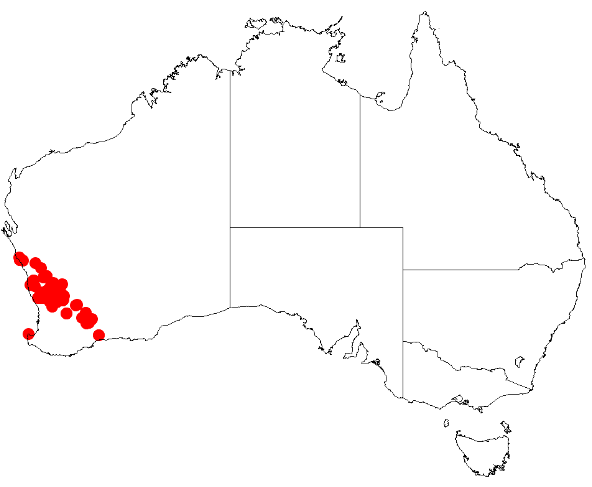
- Occurrence data from AVH

Synonyms
- Racosperma brumale (Maslin) Pedley; Acacia leiophylla auct. non Benth.: Meisner, C.D.F. in Lehmann, J.G.C.

= Acacia brumalis =

Species of legume

Acacia brumalis is a species of flowering plant in the family Fabaceae and is endemic to the south-west of Western Australia. It is a bushy or openly-branched shrub or tree with variable phyllodes, golden yellow flowers arranged in spherical to slightly oblong heads, and linear, thinly leathery to firmly papery pods.

== Description ==
Acacia brumalis is bushy or openly-branched shrub or tree that typically grows to a height of 1–3 m (3 ft 3 in – 9 ft 10 in), and sometimes has red, glabrous branchlets. Its phyllodes are variable, often lance-shaped with the narrower end towards the base, narrowly elliptic, oblong or linear, mostly 50–90 mm (2.0–3.5 in) long, 5–10 mm (0.20–0.39 in) wide. The flowers are borne in spherical or slightly oblong pods 5–8 mm (0.20–0.31 in) in diameter on racemes 6–25 mm (0.24–0.98 in) long on peduncles 3–5 mm (0.12–0.20 in) long. Each spike contains 17 to 25 golden-yellow flowers. Flowering occurs between late May and September and the pods are linear, thinly leathery to firmly papery, up to 100 mm (3.9 in) long and 5–6 mm (0.20–0.24 in) wide, containing dull black, oblong to elliptic seeds 4–5 mm (0.16–0.20 in) long.

== Taxonomy ==
Acacia brumalis was first formally described in 1995 by Bruce Maslin in the journal Nuytsia from specimens collected near the Mortlock River about 12 km (7.5 mi) south of Goomalling in 1976. The specific epithet (brumalis) means 'wintery', referring to the predominantly flower season of this wattle.

== Distribution and habitat ==
Acacia brumalis grows in a variety of soil types between Regans Ford, Wubin and Hyden but also near Morawa and Northampton, in the Avon Wheatbelt, Coolgardie, Esperance Plains, Geraldton Sandplains, Jarrah Forest, Mallee and Swan Coastal Plain bioregions of south-western Western Australia.

== Conservation status ==
Acacia brumalis is listed as "not threatened" by the Government of Western Australia Department of Biodiversity, Conservation and Attractions.

== See also ==
- List of Acacia species
