= Acacia amblyophylla =

Conservation status
- Least Concern (IUCN 3.1)

Scientific classification
- Kingdom: Plantae
- Clade: Embryophytes
- Clade: Tracheophytes
- Clade: Spermatophytes
- Clade: Angiosperms
- Clade: Eudicots
- Clade: Rosids
- Order: Fabales
- Family: Fabaceae
- Subfamily: Caesalpinioideae
- Clade: Mimosoid clade
- Genus: Acacia
- Species: A. amblyophylla

Binomial name
- Acacia amblyophylla F.Muell.
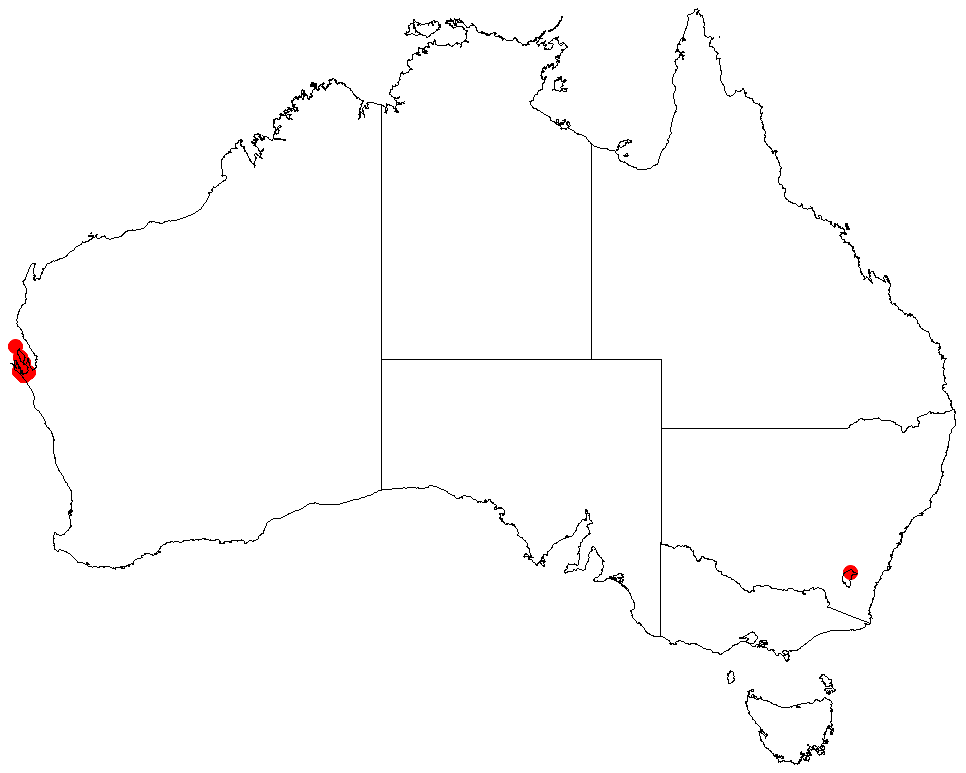
- Occurrence data from AVH

Synonyms
- Acacia amblyphylla F.Muell. orth. var.; Racosperma amblyophyllum (F.Muell.) Pedley

Species of legume

Acacia amblyophylla is a species of flowering plant in the family Fabaceae and is endemic to an area near Shark Bay in the north-west of Western Australia. It is a bushy shrub or tree with a dense crown, many suckers, lance-shaped phyllodes with the narrower end towards the base, golden-coloured flowers arranged in spherical heads each of 24 to 26, and broadly linear to narrowly oblong pods up to 200 mm (7.9 in) long.

== Description ==
Acacia amblyophylla is bushy shrub or tree that typically grows to a height of 1.5–4 m (4 ft 11 in – 13 ft 1 in), has many stems, a dense crown and many suckers. The phyllodes are more or less erect, lance-shaped with the narrower end towards the base, thinly leathery, mostly 50–80 mm (2.0–3.1 in) long and 5–10 mm (0.20–0.39 in) wide. The phyllodes are narrowed at both ends, with 1 or 2 obscure glands 10–35 mm (0.39–1.38 in) above the base. The flowers are arranged in spherical heads on peduncles 3–6 mm (0.12–0.24 in) long, each head containing 24 to 26 golden-coloured flowers. Flowering occurs from about May to August, and the pod is broadly linear to narrowly oblong, up to 200 mm (7.9 in) long, 10–13 mm (0.39–0.51 in) wide and slightly constricted between the seeds. The seeds are black, 7–9 mm (0.28–0.35 in) long and 5.5–6.5 mm (0.22–0.26 in) long.

== Taxonomy ==
Acacia amblyophylla was first formally described in 1882 by Ferdinand von Mueller in the Southern Science Record from specimens he collected near Shark Bay. The specific epithet (amblyophylla) means "blunt-leaved".

This species is quite similar to Acacia microbotrya, which occurs further south.

== Distribution and habitat ==
This species of wattle is native to an area near Shark Bay in the Gascoyne bioregion of Western Australia where it is found on limestone rises and coastal dunes growing in calcareous sandy soils.

== See also ==
- List of Acacia species
