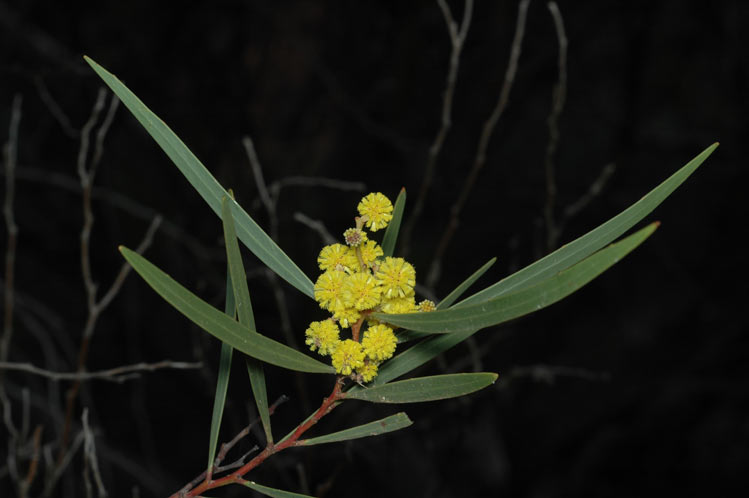
- In Mutawintji National Park

Scientific classification
- Kingdom: Plantae
- Clade: Embryophytes
- Clade: Tracheophytes
- Clade: Spermatophytes
- Clade: Angiosperms
- Clade: Eudicots
- Clade: Rosids
- Order: Fabales
- Family: Fabaceae
- Subfamily: Caesalpinioideae
- Clade: Mimosoid clade
- Genus: Acacia
- Species: A. jennerae

Binomial name
- Acacia jennerae Maiden
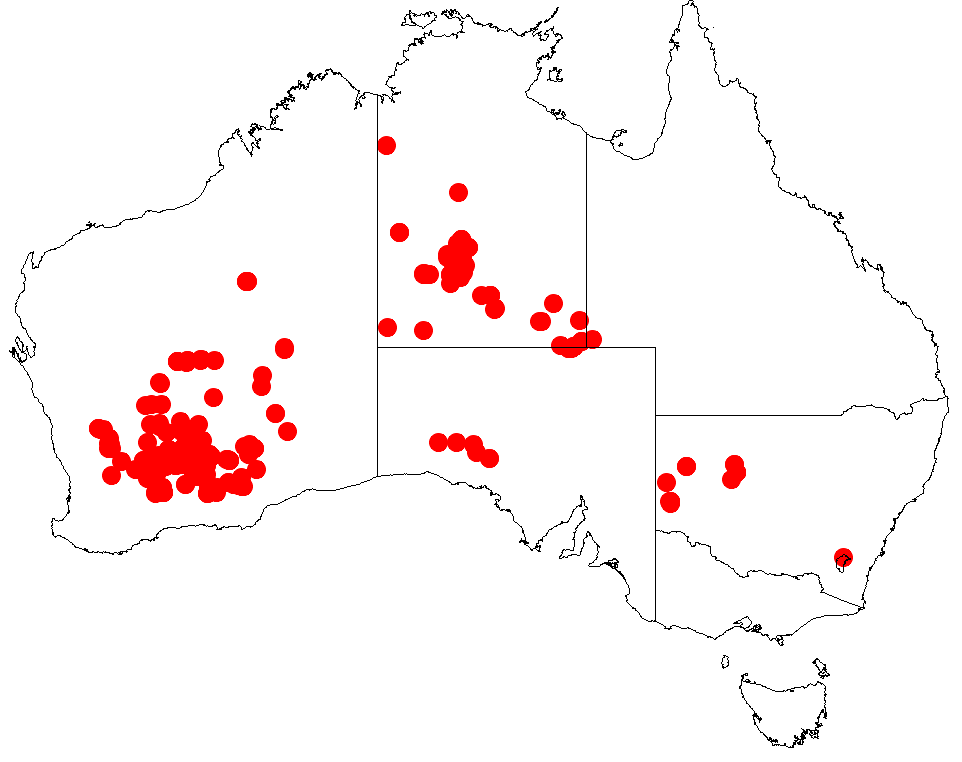
- Occurrence data from AVH

Synonyms
- Racosperma jennerae (Maiden) Pedley

= Acacia jennerae =

Cooavittra wattle

Species of plant

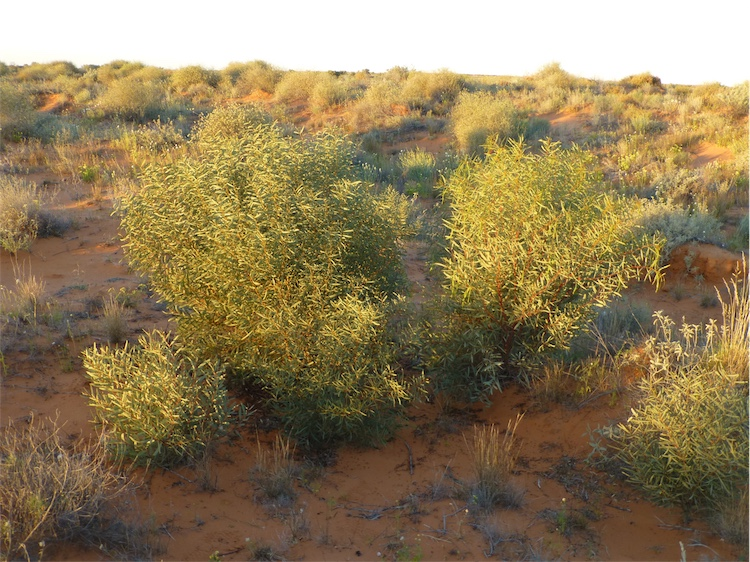
Habit in the Simpson Desert, about 34 km (21 mi) north west of Poeppel Corner

Acacia jennerae commonly known as Coonavittra wattle, is a species of flowering plant in the family Fabaceae and is endemic to arid parts of inland Australia. It is a shrub or tree with more or less straight, narrowly elliptic to narrowly lance-shaped phyllodes, spherical heads of light golden yellow flowers and thinly leathery to firmly papery pods often appearing like a string of beads.

== Description ==
Acacia jennerae is a shrub or tree that typically grows to a height of 1–6 m (3 ft 3 in – 19 ft 8 in) and has red-brown to light brown bark and glabrous branchlets. Its phyllodes are more or less straight, narrowly elliptic to narrowly lance-shaped with the narrower end towards the base, 50–110 mm (2.0–4.3 in) long and 5–15 mm (0.20–0.59 in) wide, greyish green to glaucous with a prominent midrib and two or three glands 3–10 mm (0.12–0.39 in) above the pulvinus. Its flowers are borne in spherical heads on slender peduncles 3–6 mm (0.12–0.24 in) long, each head with twenty to thirty light golden yellow flowers. Flowering mainly occurs from March to July, but also between January and August, and the pods are up to 150 mm (5.9 in) long, 6–8 mm (0.24–0.31 in) wide, thinly leathery to firmly papery, glabrous, dark brown to blackish and appearing more or less like a string of beads. The seeds are oblong, 6–8 mm (0.24–0.31 in) long and dull black with a club-shaped aril.

== Taxonomy ==
Acacia jennerae was first formally described by the botanist Joseph Maiden in the book, The Flora of the Northern Territory from specimens collected "at the waterhole about 80 mi (130 km) north-east of Camp 2 in the Northern Territory" in 1911. The specific epithet (jennerae) honours Amelia Maud Jenner, librarian at the Royal Botanic Gardens, Sydney for her assistance to the author.

== Distribution and habitat ==
This species of wattle is found sporadically in arid and semi-arid areas of inland Australia, often in red, sandly soils, from near Kununoppin in Western Australia through South Australia and the Northern Territory to Wilcannia in New South Wales, and the Simpson Desert in far south-western Queensland.

== Conservation status ==
Acacia jennerae is listed as 'not threatened' by the Government of Western Australia Department of Parks and Wildlife.

== See also ==
- List of Acacia species
