= Acacia splendens =

Conservation status
- Endangered (EPBC Act)

Scientific classification
- Kingdom: Plantae
- Clade: Tracheophytes
- Clade: Angiosperms
- Clade: Eudicots
- Clade: Rosids
- Order: Fabales
- Family: Fabaceae
- Subfamily: Caesalpinioideae
- Clade: Mimosoid clade
- Genus: Acacia
- Species: A. splendens

Binomial name
- Acacia splendens Maslin & C.P.Elliott
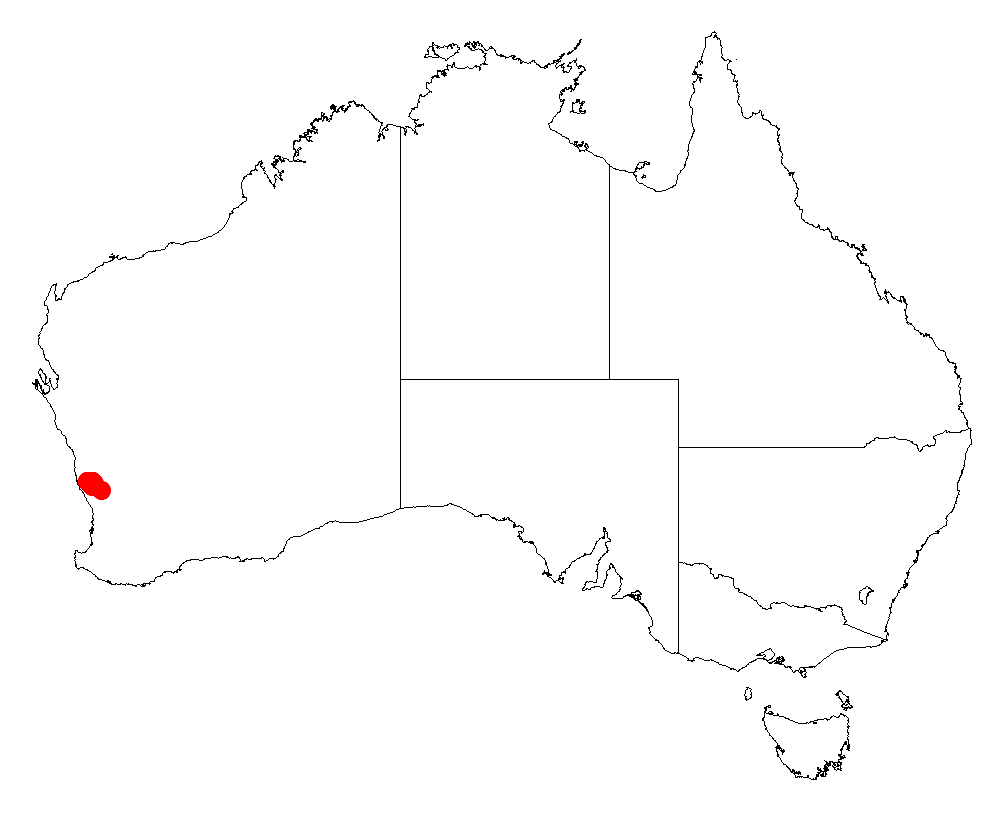
- Occurrence data from AVH

Species of legume

Acacia splendens is a tree or shrub of the genus Acacia and the subgenus Phyllodineae that is endemic to a small area of western Australia.

== Description ==
The tree or shrub typically grows to a height of 8 metres (26 ft) and has an open habit. It has thick, glabrous branchlets that are angled at the extremities and covered in a fine white powdery coating. Like most species of Acacia it has phyllodes rather than true leaves. The glabrous phyllodes are found at the end of obvious stem-projections forming narrow wings that are 6 to 12 cm (2.4 to 4.7 in) in length and 1 to 8 cm (0.39 to 3.15 in) wide and have one nerve per face and finely penninerved. It blooms in May and produces yellow flowers. The inflorescences are found on a raceme that is 1.5 to 15 cm (0.59 to 5.91 in) in length. The spherical to obloid shaped flower-heads contain 33 to 75 golden coloured flowers. Following flowering glabrous, firmly chartaceous, narrowly oblong seed pods form that are up to 14 cm (5.5 in) in length and 7 to 12 mm (0.28 to 0.47 in) wide and are covered in a fine white powdery coating. The shiny black seeds inside the pods have an oblong to elliptic shape with a length of 5 to 6 mm (0.20 to 0.24 in) with a dark red-brown club shaped aril.

== Taxonomy ==
The species was first formally described by the botanists Bruce Maslin and Carole Elliott in 2006 as a part of the work Acacia splendens (Leguminosae : Mimosoideae), a new rare species from near Dandaragan, Western Australia as published in the journal Nuytsia.

== Distribution ==
It is native to a small area in the Wheatbelt region of Western Australia, all found in a single population to the north west of Dandaragan growing gravelly loam soils among laterite breakaways as a part of low Eucalyptus woodland communities.

== See also ==
- List of Acacia species
