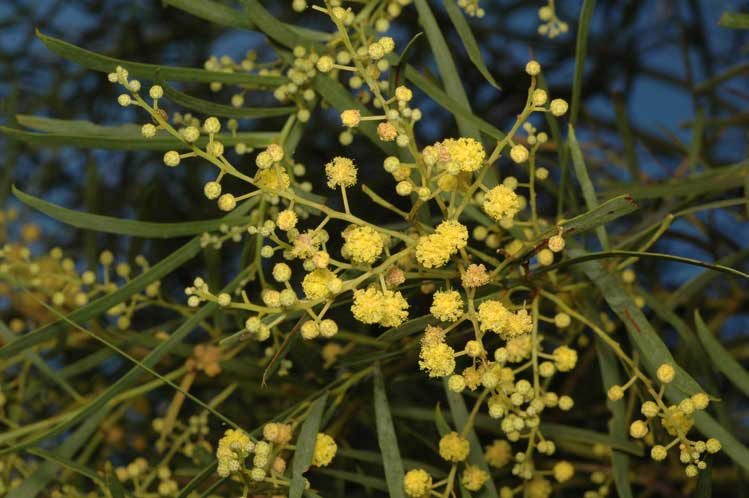
- In the Australian National Botanic Gardens

Conservation status
- Least Concern (IUCN 3.1)

Scientific classification
- Kingdom: Plantae
- Clade: Embryophytes
- Clade: Tracheophytes
- Clade: Spermatophytes
- Clade: Angiosperms
- Clade: Eudicots
- Clade: Rosids
- Order: Fabales
- Family: Fabaceae
- Subfamily: Caesalpinioideae
- Clade: Mimosoid clade
- Genus: Acacia
- Species: A. aestivalis

Binomial name
- Acacia aestivalis E.Pritz.
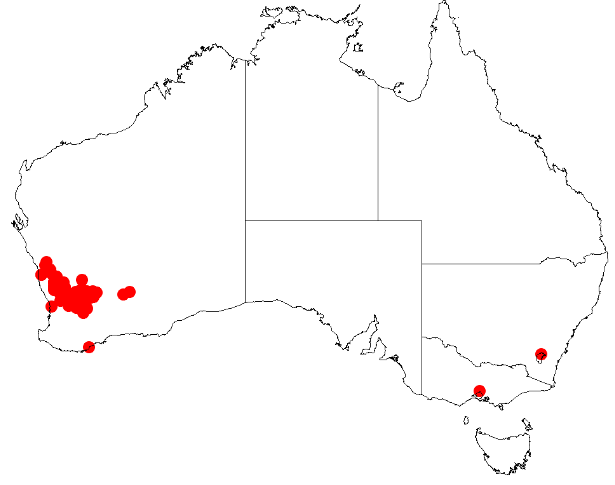
- Occurrence data from AVH

Synonyms
- Racosperma aestivale (E.Pritz.) Pedley; Acacia harveyi auct. non Benth.: Bentham, G., Flora Australiensis volume 2

= Acacia aestivalis =

Species of legume

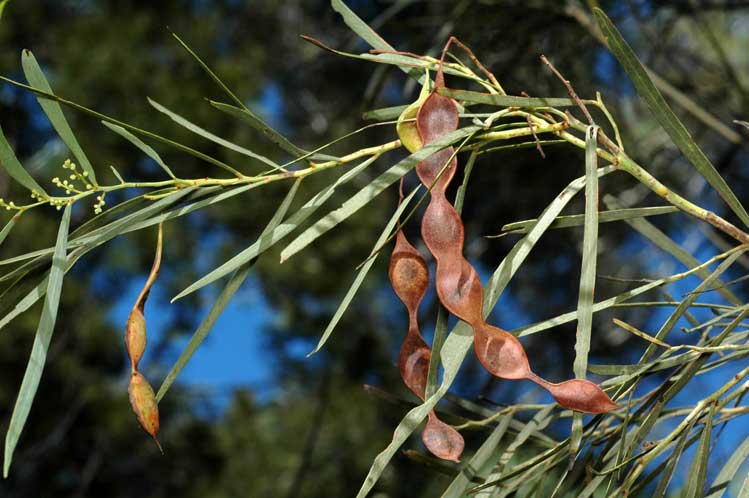
Pods

Acacia aestivalis is a species of flowering plant in the family Fabaceae and is endemic to the south-west of Western Australia. It is a bushy shrub or tree with linear to narrowly lance-shaped phyllodes, the narrower end towards the base, racemes of 5 to 11 spherical heads of golden-yellow flowers, and glabrous, papery to thinly leathery pods.

== Description ==
Acacia aestivalis is a bushy shrub or tree that typically grows to a height of 2–4 m (6 ft 7 in – 13 ft 1 in) and has glabrous branchlets. Its phyllodes are linear to lance-shaped with the narrower end towards the base, mostly 60–110 mm (2.4–4.3 in) long and 2.5–7 mm (0.098–0.276 in) wide, with 1 or 2 glands 10–35 mm (0.39–1.38 in) above the base of the phyllode. The flowers are arranged in racemes 10–50 mm (0.39–1.97 in) long, of 5 to 11 spherical heads, 3.5–4.0 mm (0.14–0.16 in) in diameter, each head on a hairy on a peduncle 2.5–5 mm (0.098–0.197 in) long. The heads contains 15 to 25 golden-yellow flowers. Flowering occurs from November to December and the pod is papery to thinly leathery, up to 170 mm (6.7 in) long and 10–22 mm (0.39–0.87 in) wide, containing dull dark brown, oblong seeds 7–9 mm (0.28–0.35 in) long with a brittle, reddish-brown aril on the end.

== Taxonomy ==
Acacia aestivalis was first formally described in 1904 by the botanist Ernst Georg Pritzel in Botanische Jahrbücher für Systematik, Pflanzengeschichte und Pflanzengeographie from specimens collected near Moora.

The specific epithet, aestivalis, is derived from Latin and means "pertaining to the summer".

== Distribution ==
This species of wattle is endemic to an area in the Avon Wheatbelt, Coolgardie, Geraldton Sandplains, Jarrah Forest and Mallee bioregions of south-western Western Australia where it is frequently found along roadsides and on low-lying flats growing in clay, loamy or sandy soils. It is commonly a part of mid-storey of Eucalyptus salmonophloia woodland communities but will also form dense stands in disturbed areas.

== See also ==
- List of Acacia species
