= Acacia microbotrya =

Manna wattle
- In the Mount Annan Botanic Gardens

Scientific classification
- Kingdom: Plantae
- Clade: Tracheophytes
- Clade: Angiosperms
- Clade: Eudicots
- Clade: Rosids
- Order: Fabales
- Family: Fabaceae
- Subfamily: Caesalpinioideae
- Clade: Mimosoid clade
- Genus: Acacia
- Species: A. microbotrya

Binomial name
- Acacia microbotrya Benth.
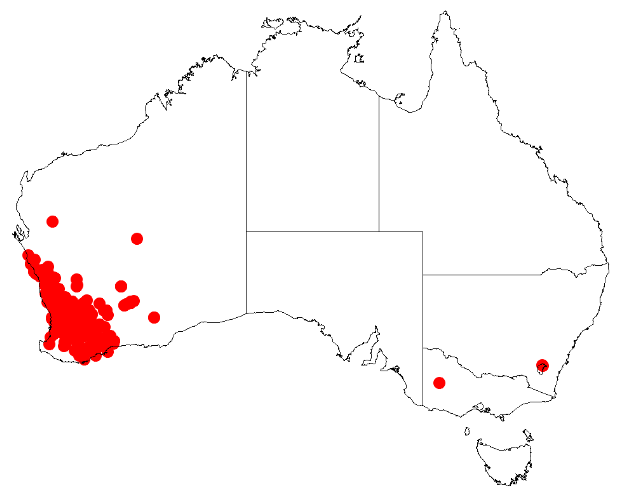
- Occurrence data from AVH

Synonyms
- Acacia bartleana Maslin nom. inval., nom. nud.; ? Acacia microbotrya var. borealis E.Pritz.; Acacia microbotrya Benth. var. microbotrya; Acacia myriobotrya Meisn.; Fusanus diversifolius Miq. p.p.; Racosperma microbotryum (Benth.) Pedley; Acacia rostellifera auct. non Benth.: Seemann, B.C. (1852)

Species of legume

Pods

Acacia microbotrya, commonly known as manna wattle, is a species of flowering plant in the family Fabaceae, and is endemic to the south-west of Western Australia. It is a sturdy shrub or tree with up to three main trunks, a bushy crown, narrowly elliptic to lance-shaped phyllodes, spherical heads of showy cream to pale yellow or bright lemon yellow flowers, and thinly leathery pods somewhat resembling a string of beads. The Noongar peoples know the tree as badjong, galyang, koonert or menna.

== Description ==
Acacia microbotryais a sturdy shrub or tree that typically grows to a height of 3–8 m (9.8–26.2 ft) with up to three main trunks and a bushy crown. Its bark is grey to black, smooth to rough and longitudinally fissured, and the branchlets are glabrous. The phyllodes are narrowly elliptic to lance-shaped with the narrower end towards the base, slightly to obviously sickle-shaped with the edges turned down, 80–150 mm (3.1–5.9 in) long, 8–18 mm (0.31–0.71 in) wide, thinly leathery, grey-green to glaucous and glabrous, with a single vein on each face. The flowers are showy and borne in spherical heads in racemes 10–60 mm (0.39–2.36 in) long, the heads on peduncles 2–6 mm (0.079–0.236 in) long. Each head is 3–6 mm (0.12–0.24 in) in diameter with 20 to 35 cream-coloured to pale yellow or bright lemon yellow flowers. Flowering occurs from April to early July, with the main flush from early May to late June. The pods are 90–200 mm (3.5–7.9 in) long, 6–9 mm (0.24–0.35 in) wide, thinly leathery, dark brown to black, glabrous, and somewhat resembling a string of beads. The seeds are oblong to elliptic, 5–8 mm (0.20–0.31 in) long, 3–5 mm (0.12–0.20 in) wide, dark brown to black with a club-shaped aril.

== Taxonomy ==
Acacia microbotrya was first formally described in 1842 by George Bentham in Hooker's London Journal of Botany from specimens collected in the Swan River Colony by James Drummond. The specific epithet (microbotrya) means 'a small bunch of grapes' or 'a small raceme'.

A. microbotrya is very closely related to A. amblyophylla and A. jennerae and is superficially similar to A. galeata and A. saligna.

== Distribution and habitat ==
Manna wattle grows in a range of habitats, often on clay-loam or sandy loam flats and often near watercourses, from near Dandaragan to near Merredin and south to near Kojonup and Ravensthorpe in the Avon Wheatbelt, Esperance Plains, Geraldton Sandplains, Jarrah Forest, Mallee and Swan Coastal Plain bioregions of south-western Western Australia. It is both native and naturalised in its range.

== Use in horticulture ==
The plant is commercially available in seed form or as tubestock. It is commonly used in native gardens as in land rehabilitation an ornamental, as a windbreak, for shelter and for sandalwood. It is fast growing is salt tolerant and will survive in waterlogged areas.

== See also ==
- List of Acacia species
