= Acacia galeata =

Scientific classification
- Kingdom: Plantae
- Clade: Tracheophytes
- Clade: Angiosperms
- Clade: Eudicots
- Clade: Rosids
- Order: Fabales
- Family: Fabaceae
- Subfamily: Caesalpinioideae
- Clade: Mimosoid clade
- Genus: Acacia
- Species: A. galeata

Binomial name
- Acacia galeata Maslin
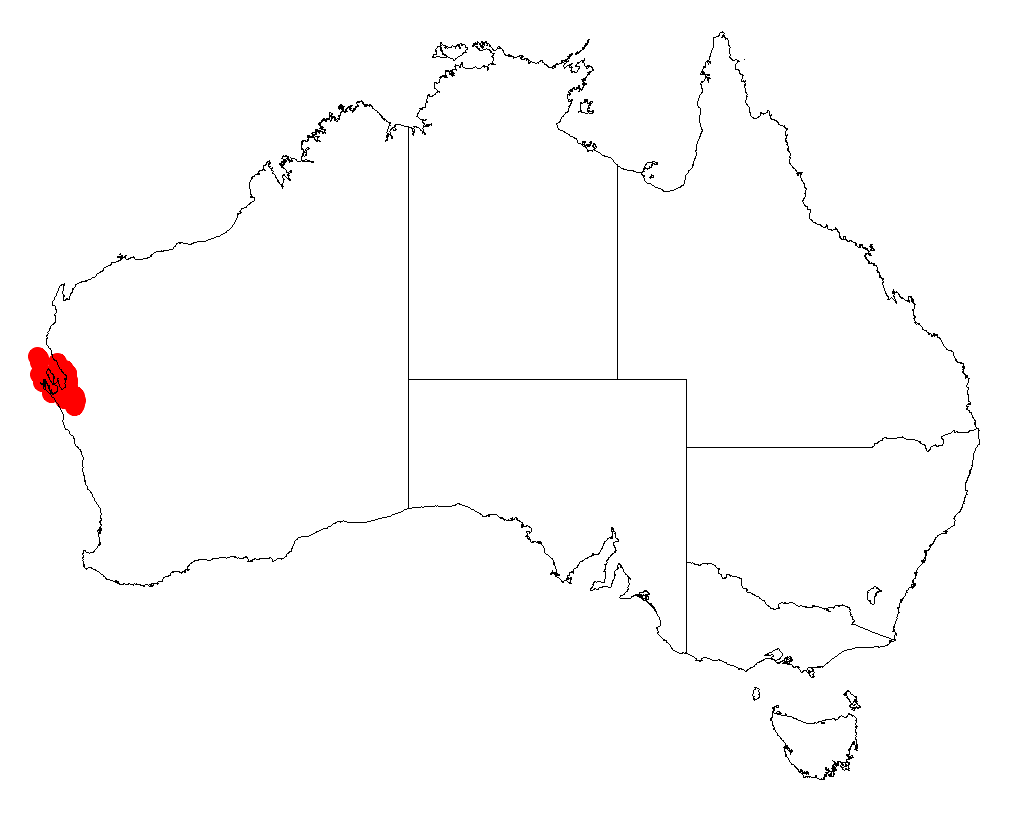
- Occurrence data from AVH

Synonyms
- Racosperma galeatum (Maslin) Pedley

Species of legume

Acacia galeata is a species of flowering plant in the family Fabaceae and is endemic to the western of Western Australia. It is a bushy shrub or tree with glabrous branchlets, narrowly elliptic to lance-shaped phyllodes, spherical heads of golden yellow flowers and leathery to woody pods resembling a string of beads, strongly raised over, and more or less constricted between the seeds.

== Description ==
Acacia galeata is a bushy, rounded shrub or tree that typically grows to a height of 1–6 m (3 ft 3 in – 19 ft 8 in) and has glabrous branchlets. Its phyllodes are narrowly elliptic to lance-shaped, straight to slightly sickle-shaped, 60–110 mm (2.4–4.3 in) long and 6–15 mm (0.24–0.59 in) wide, rather glaucous, usually with two or three main veins. The flowers are born in three to five spherical heads in racemes on peduncles 4–7 mm (0.16–0.28 in) long, each head 4–5 mm (0.16–0.20 in) in diameter with 35 to 45 golden yellow flowers. Flowering occurs from April to June, and the pods resemble a string of beads, up to 180 mm (7.1 in) long, 7–8 mm (0.28–0.31 in) wide and leathery to more or less woody, raised over and more or less constricted between the seeds. The seeds are broadly elliptic to oblong, up to 7.5 mm (0.30 in) long, slightly glossy dark brown with a large, hood-shaped aril.

== Taxonomy ==
Acacia galeata was first formally described in 1983 by Bruce Maslin from specimens collected 12 km (7.5 mi) north of the Woodleigh turn of on the North West Coastal Highway in 1982. The specific epithet (galeata) means 'helmeted', and refers to the prominent, hood-shaped aril.

== Distribution and habitat ==
This species of wattle grows in sand and loam in scrub, shrubland and low woodland in the Shark Bay area from around Wooramel Station to Nerren Nerren Station and on Dorre and Dirk Hartog Islands in the Carnarvon and Yalgoo bioregions in the west of Western Australia.

== Conservation status ==
Acacia galeata is listed as "not threatened" by the Government of Western Australia Department of Biodiversity, Conservation and Attractions.

== See also ==
- List of Acacia species
