= Acacia chamaeleon =

- Foliage and fruit

Scientific classification
- Kingdom: Plantae
- Clade: Tracheophytes
- Clade: Angiosperms
- Clade: Eudicots
- Clade: Rosids
- Order: Fabales
- Family: Fabaceae
- Subfamily: Caesalpinioideae
- Clade: Mimosoid clade
- Genus: Acacia
- Species: A. chamaeleon

Binomial name
- Acacia chamaeleon Maslin
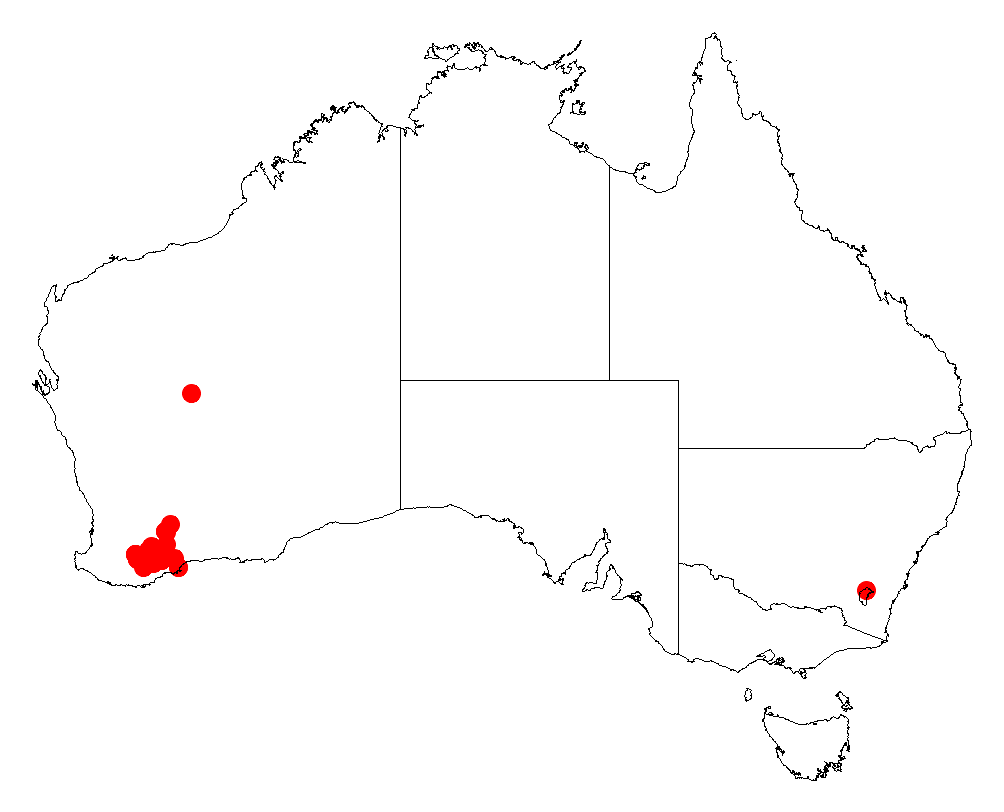
- Occurrence data from AVH

Synonyms
- ?Acacia leiophylla var. microcephala Meisn.; Acacia stowardii S.Moore nom. illeg.; Racosperma chamaeleon (Maslin) Pedley

Species of legume

Habit near Needilup Road, east of Pingrup

Acacia chamaeleon is a species of flowering plant in the family Fabaceae and is endemic to the south-west of Western Australia. It is an openly crowned, sparingly-branched, glabrous shrub with narrowly linear to thread-like or lance-shaped phyllodes with the narrower end towards the base, spherical heads of more or less golden yellow flowers, and linear, firmly papery to thinly leathery pods.

== Description ==
Acacia chamaeleon is an openly crowned shrub that typically grows to a height of up to 2–3 m (6 ft 7 in – 9 ft 10 in). It is single-stemmed or sparingly branched near ground level. The phyllodes are variable in shape and size, mostly narrowly linear to thread-like, or lance-shaped to narrowly lance-shaped with the narrower end towards the base 60–210 mm (2.4–8.3 in) long and 2–5 mm (0.079–0.197 in) wide. The flowers are borne a spherical heads in four to seven racemes 10–42 mm (0.39–1.65 in) long, on peduncles mostly 4–6 mm (0.16–0.24 in) long. Each head is 5.5–7 mm (0.22–0.28 in) in diameter with 23 to 37 more or less golden yellow flowers. Flowering occurs throughout the year with peaks in May and December, and the pods are linear, firmly papery to thinly leathery, scarcely constricted between the seeds, up to 100 mm (3.9 in) long and 4–5 mm (0.16–0.20 in) wide. The seeds are oblong to elliptic, 4–5 mm (0.16–0.20 in) long with a club-shaped aril.

== Taxonomy ==
Acacia chamaeleon was first formally described in 1995 by Bruce Maslin in the journal Nuytsia from specimens he collected about 8 km (5.0 mi) north of Ongerup in 1971. The specific epithet (chamaeleon) means 'a lizard' that is changeable in its colour, referring to the phyllodes "which are very variable in shape and size".

== Distribution and habitat ==
This species of wattle is found in clay or loam in shrubland on undulating plains, flats and rises in the Avon Wheatbelt, Esperance Plains and Mallee bioregions of south-western Western Australia.

== Conservation status ==
Acacia chamaeleon is listed as 'Not threatened' by the Government of Western Australia Department of Biodiversity, Conservation and Attractions.

== See also ==
- List of Acacia species
