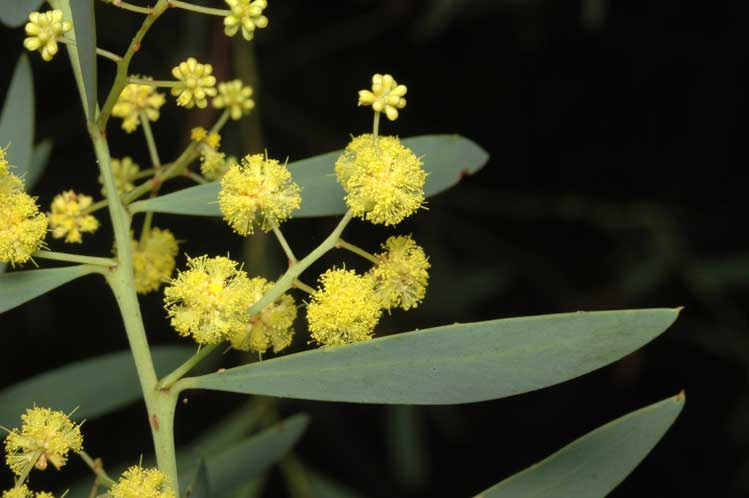
- In the Australian National Botanic Gardens

Scientific classification
- Kingdom: Plantae
- Clade: Embryophytes
- Clade: Tracheophytes
- Clade: Angiosperms
- Clade: Eudicots
- Clade: Rosids
- Order: Fabales
- Family: Fabaceae
- Subfamily: Caesalpinioideae
- Clade: Mimosoid clade
- Genus: Acacia
- Species: A. wattsiana

Binomial name
- Acacia wattsiana F.Muell. ex Benth.
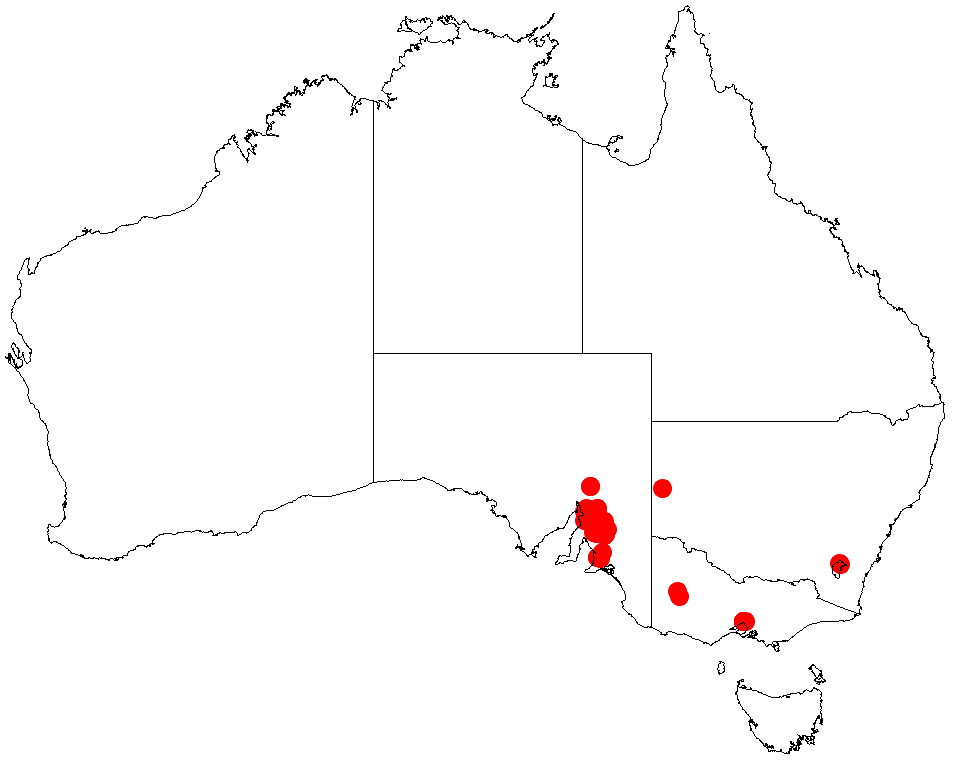
- Occurrence data from AVH

= Acacia wattsiana =

Species of legume

Acacia wattsiana, commonly known as Watt's wattle or dog wattle, is a flowering plant in the family Fabaceae. It is a species of wattle native to South Australia.
