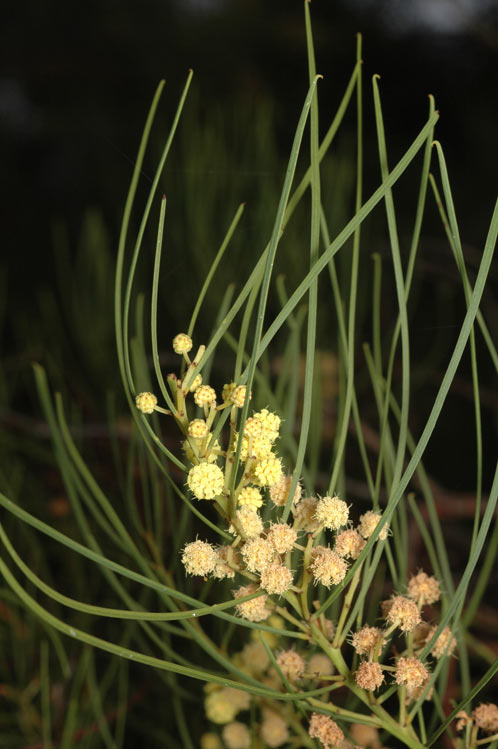

Scientific classification
- Kingdom: Plantae
- Clade: Tracheophytes
- Clade: Angiosperms
- Clade: Eudicots
- Clade: Rosids
- Order: Fabales
- Family: Fabaceae
- Subfamily: Caesalpinioideae
- Clade: Mimosoid clade
- Genus: Acacia
- Species: A. harveyi

Binomial name
- Acacia harveyi Benth.
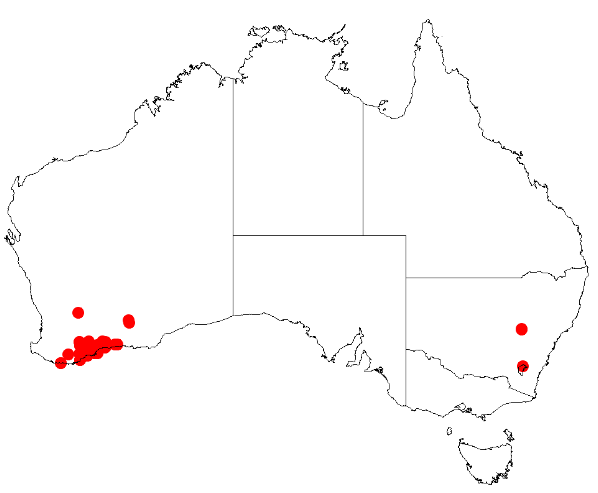
- Occurrence data from AVH

= Acacia harveyi =

Species of legume

Acacia harveyi is a species of flowering plant in the family Fabaceae and is endemic to the south west of Western Australia. It is commonly an inverted cone-shaped, dense shrub with crowded, mostly ascending to erect linear phyllodes, spherical heads of cream-coloured or lemon yellow flowers and narrowly oblong, firmly papery pods.

== Description ==
Acacia harveyi is commonly an inverted con-shaped, dense shrub that typically grows to a height of 2–4 m (6 ft 7 in – 13 ft 1 in) and has finely ribbed, glabrous branchlets. Its phyllodes are crowded, mostly ascending to erect, linear, straight to slightly curved, mostly 50–120 mm (2.0–4.7 in) long and 1–3.5 mm (0.039–0.138 in) wide with a hooked tip. There is a prominent midrib on the phyllodes and an inconspicuous gland usually 3–15 mm (0.12–0.59 in) above the pulvinus. The flowers are borne in three to eight spherical heads in racemes 10–25 mm (0.39–0.98 in) long on peduncles 3–4 mm (0.12–0.16 in) long. The heads are 3.5–4.5 mm (0.14–0.18 in) in diameter with 20 to 30 densely arranged cream-coloured or lemon yellow flowers. Flowering occurs from March to May and from July to October, and the pods are narrowly oblong, up to 80 mm (3.1 in) long, 5–6 mm (0.20–0.24 in) wide, firmly papery, glabrous and scarcely constricted between the seeds. The seeds are oblong, 4.0–4.5 mm (0.16–0.18 in) wide, dull black with a red-brown, thread-like attachment and a thick aril.

== Taxonomy ==
Acacia harveyi was first formally described in 1864 by George Bentham in his Flora Australiensis from specimens collected by James Drummond and William Henry Harvey "between King George's Sound and Cape Riche". The specific epithet (harveyi) honours William Harvey.

== Distribution and habitat ==
This species of wattle grows in rocky clay, sand or loam, often along watercourses in eucalypt woodland and scrub, mainly in the Fitzgerald River National Park, west to near the Stirling Range and east to Munglinup in the Esperance Plains and Mallee bioregions of south-western Western Australia.

== Conservation status ==
Acacia harveyi is listed as "not threatened" by the Government of Western Australia Department of Biodiversity, Conservation and Attractions.

== See also ==
- List of Acacia species
