= Regans Ford, Western Australia =

Regans Ford
- Town
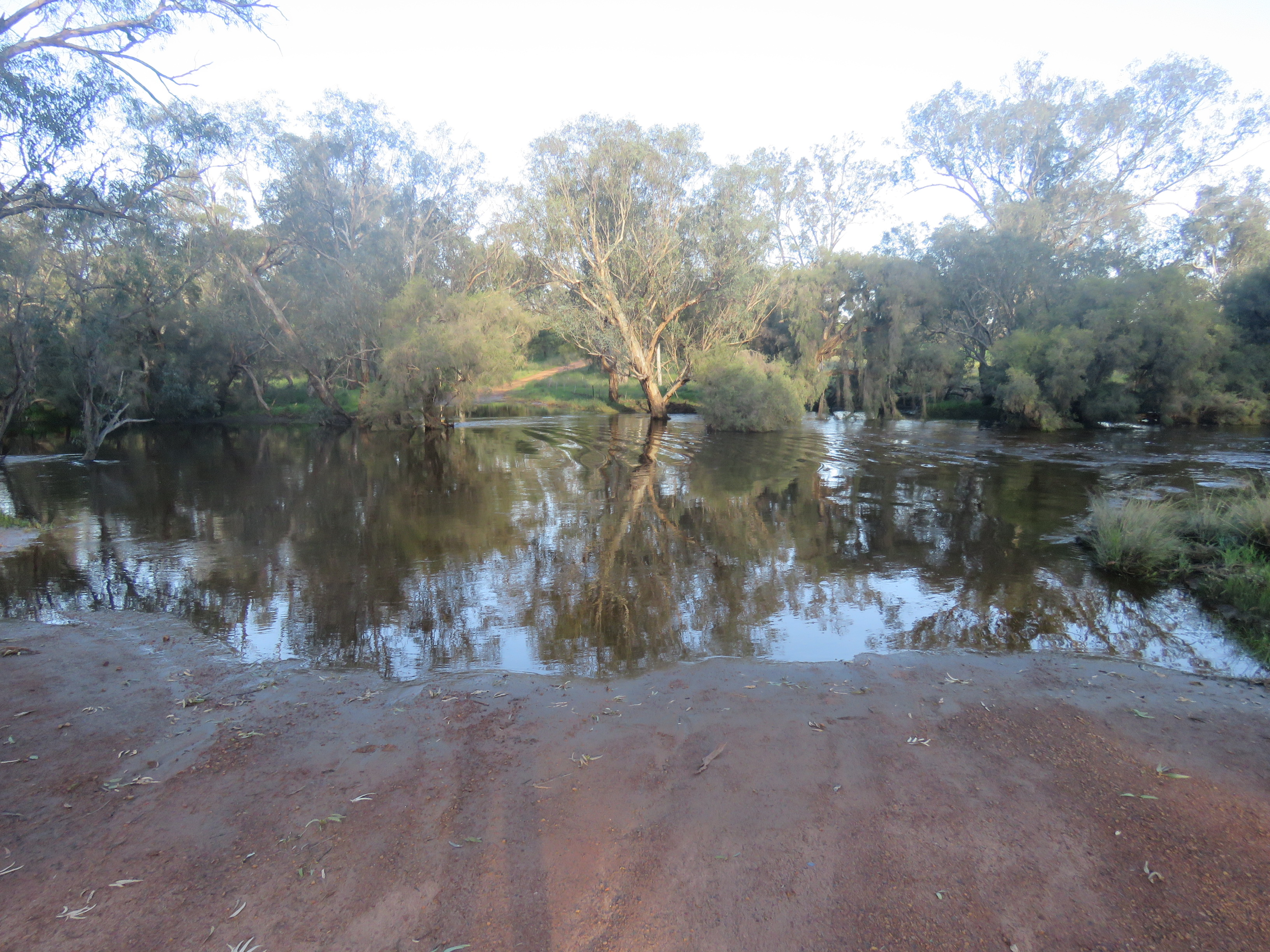
- The former Moore River crossing at Regans Ford, now closed, in August 2022

- Coordinates: 30°57′00″S 115°51′00″E
- Country: Australia
- State: Western Australia
- LGA(s): Shire of Dandaragan
- Location: 110 km (68 mi) N of Perth; 50 km (31 mi) E of Lancelin

Government
  - State electorate(s): Moore
  - Federal division(s): Durack

Area
  - Total: 245.8 km^{2} (94.9 sq mi)

Population
  - Total(s): 25 (SAL 2016)
- Postcode: 6507

Regans Ford is a small town located in the Wheatbelt region of Western Australia, about 110 kilometres (70 mi) north of Perth in the Shire of Dandaragan.

The surrounding areas produce wheat and other cereal crops. The town is a receival site for Cooperative Bulk Handling.

== History ==
The town is named after a ford over the Moore River, which has appeared on maps since at least 1880. The ford was in turn named after Edward Regan, a shepherd in the area in the 1860s, who acquired land near the ford in the 1870s. According to some sources, Regan was contracted to build the crossing with Aboriginal labour.

In 1880, the land adjacent to the ford was reserved as a watering place for travellers and stock. In 1968, during planning for a new road from Gingin to Eneabba, it was suggested that the land be used as a townsite.
