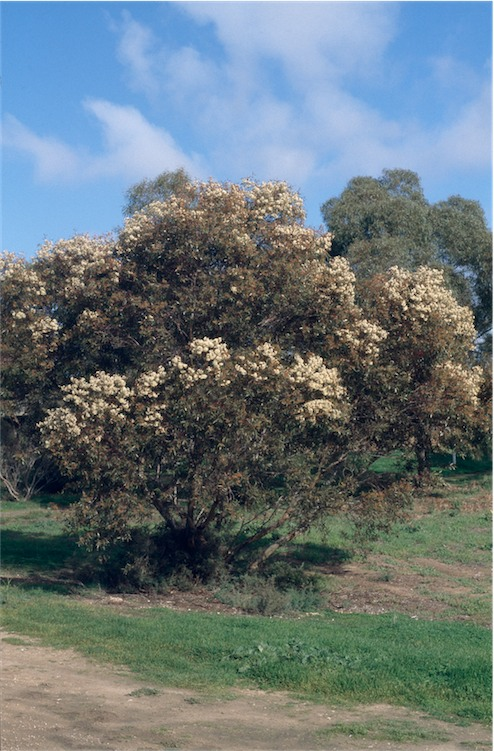
- Eucalyptus calycogona near Murray Bridge

Conservation status
- Endangered (IUCN 3.1)

Scientific classification
- Kingdom: Plantae
- Clade: Tracheophytes
- Clade: Angiosperms
- Clade: Eudicots
- Clade: Rosids
- Order: Myrtales
- Family: Myrtaceae
- Genus: Eucalyptus
- Species: E. calycogona

Binomial name
- Eucalyptus calycogona Turcz.

= Eucalyptus calycogona =

Gooseberry mallee

Species of eucalyptus in Australia

Eucalyptus calycogona, commonly known as the gooseberry mallee or square fruited mallee, is a mallee that is endemic to southern Australia. It has smooth bark, narrow lance-shaped adult leaves, flower buds that are square in cross-section arranged in groups of seven in leaf axils, creamy white, sometimes pink flowers, and fruit that are square in cross-section.

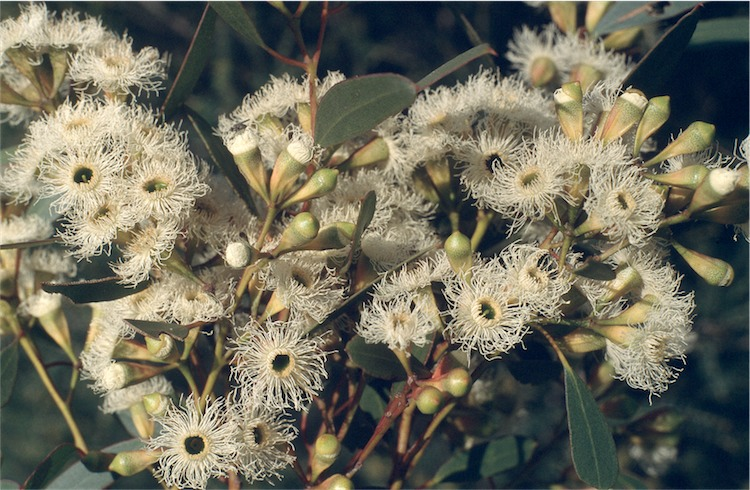
Flowers and buds

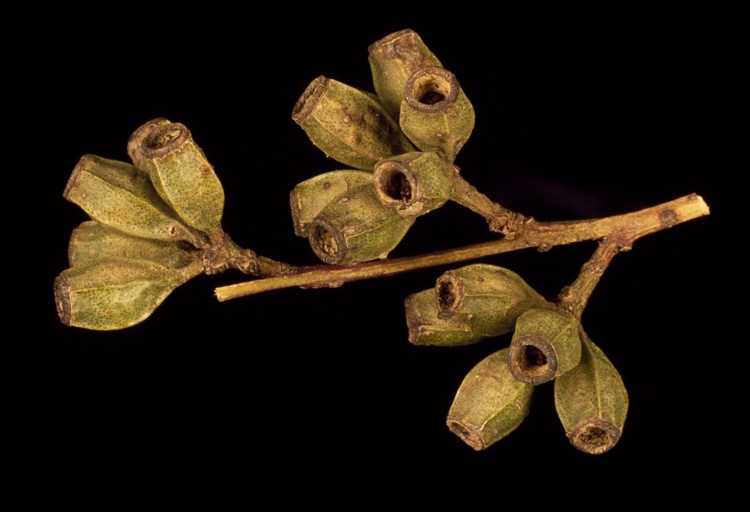
Fruit

== Description ==
Eucalyptus calycogona is mallee that typically grows to a height of 5–6 m (16–20 ft), or rarely a small tree, and forms a lignotuber. It has smooth cream-coloured grey, pinkish, sometimes powdery bark and sometimes has rough bark near the base. Young plants and coppice regrowth have dull greyish green leaves arranged in opposite pairs, lance-shaped to oblong, 18–60 mm (0.71–2.36 in) long and 6–20 mm (0.24–0.79 in) wide. The adult leaves are arranged alternately, narrow lance-shaped, the same glossy green on both sides, 50–100 mm (2.0–3.9 in) long and 7–20 mm (0.28–0.79 in) wide on a petiole 5–17 mm (0.20–0.67 in) long. The flowers buds are arranged in groups of seven in leaf axils on a peduncle 5–10 mm (0.20–0.39 in) long, the individual buds on pedicels 2–7 mm (0.079–0.276 in) long. Mature buds are oblong, square in cross-section, 7–13 mm (0.28–0.51 in) long and 3–5 mm (0.12–0.20 in) wide with four ribs along their sides. Flowering occurs between May and November and the flowers are creamy white or sometimes pink. There are two rows of stamens, the outer ring of stamens not producing pollen. The fruit is a woody capsule 5–15 mm (0.20–0.59 in) long and 4–8 mm (0.16–0.31 in) wide, barrel-shaped or urn-shaped in side view and more or less square in cross section with four ribs along the sides.

== Taxonomy ==
Eucalyptus calycogona was first formally described by Nikolai Turczaninow in 1852 and the description was published in the Bulletin de la Classe Physico-Mathématique de l'Académie Impériale des Sciences de Saint-Pétersbourg.

Four subspecies have been formally described and accepted by the Australian Plant Census:

- Eucalyptus calycogona Turcz. subsp. calycogona has smooth bark throughout, small buds and fruit with moderate ribbing and sometimes dark pink flowers;
- Eucalyptus calycogona subsp. miraculum Nicolle & M.E.French has a waxy covering on the branches, buds and fruit;
- Eucalyptus calycogona subsp. spaffordi Nicolle has broad, thick leaves and prominently ribbed buds and fruit;
- Eucalyptus calycogona subsp. trachybasis Nicolle usually has rough bark on the base of the main stems, and larger buds and fruit.

== Distribution and habitat ==
Gooseberry mallee grows in mallee woodlands and shrublands in Western Australia, South Australia, Victoria and New South Wales.

Subspecies calycogona is the most widespread of the subspecies and occurs in all these states, especially in Western Australia where it grows in the southern and central wheatbelt, Great Southern and southern Goldfields-Esperance regions of Western Australia extending eastwards almost to Balladonia. It is found on the Eyre Peninsula and south-eastern Mount Lofty Ranges of South Australia, the Big Desert area of Victoria and the Koraleigh area in the far south-west of New South Wales.

Subspecies trachybasis is found from the eastern side of Spencer Gulf in South Australia, westwards to Boort and Kerang and north from Edenhope in Victoria. Subspecies spaffordii is restricted to southern parts of the Eyre Peninsula in South Australia and subspecies miracula in an area to the south of Southern Cross in Western Australia.

This species is associated with the chenopod mallee subgroup. The chenopod mallee subgroup has E. calycogona along with other trees including Eucalyptus gracilis, Eucalyptus dumosa and Eucalyptus oleosa the understorey includes species of Maireana, Sclerolaena, Enchylaena, Chenopodium and Zygophyllum.

== Use in horticulture ==
E. calycogona is cultivated as an ornamental or shade tree that is suitable for coastal or inland areas. The tree is tolerant of drought, lime and moderate frost and is bird and insect attracting.

== See also ==
- List of Eucalyptus species
