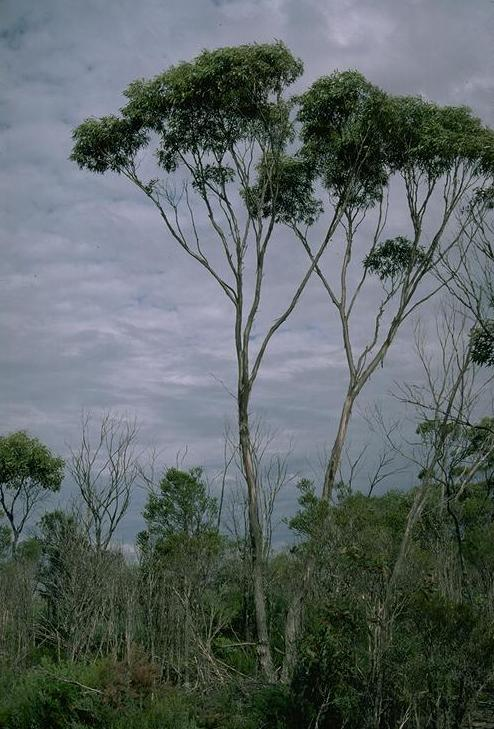
- Eucalyptus uncinata near Esperance

Conservation status
- Vulnerable (IUCN 3.1)

Scientific classification
- Kingdom: Plantae
- Clade: Tracheophytes
- Clade: Angiosperms
- Clade: Eudicots
- Clade: Rosids
- Order: Myrtales
- Family: Myrtaceae
- Genus: Eucalyptus
- Species: E. uncinata

Binomial name
- Eucalyptus uncinata Turcz.

Synonyms
- Eucalyptus desertorum Naudin; Eucalyptus dumosa var. puncticulata Benth.; Eucalyptus puncticulata (Benth.) Blakely; Eucalyptus uncinata var. latifolia Benth.; Eucalyptus uncinata Turcz. var. uncinata

= Eucalyptus uncinata =

Hook-leaved mallee

Species of eucalyptus

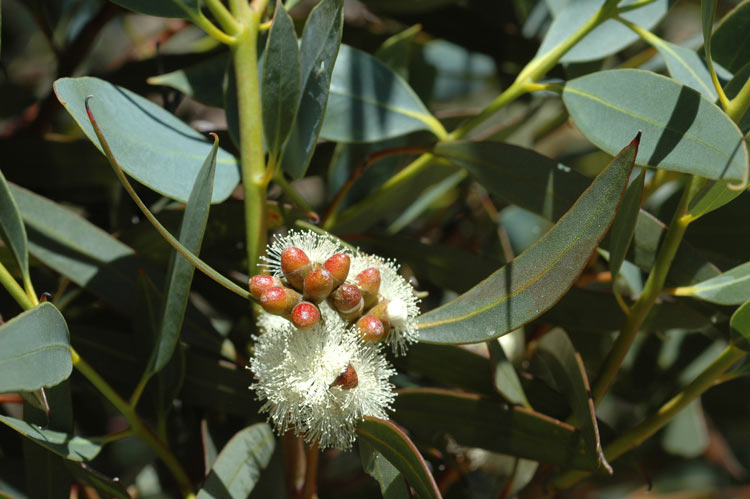
Flower buds and flowers

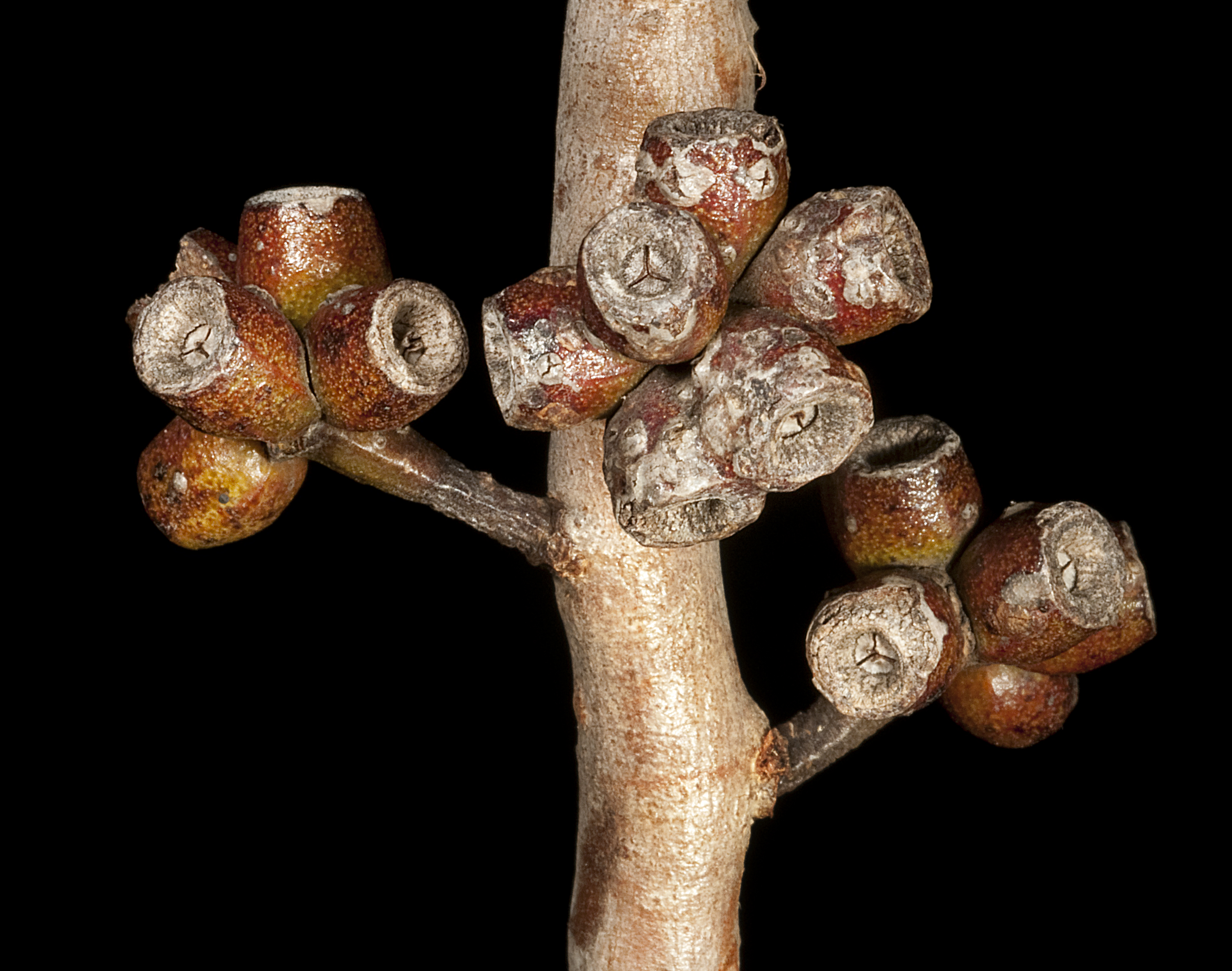
Fruit

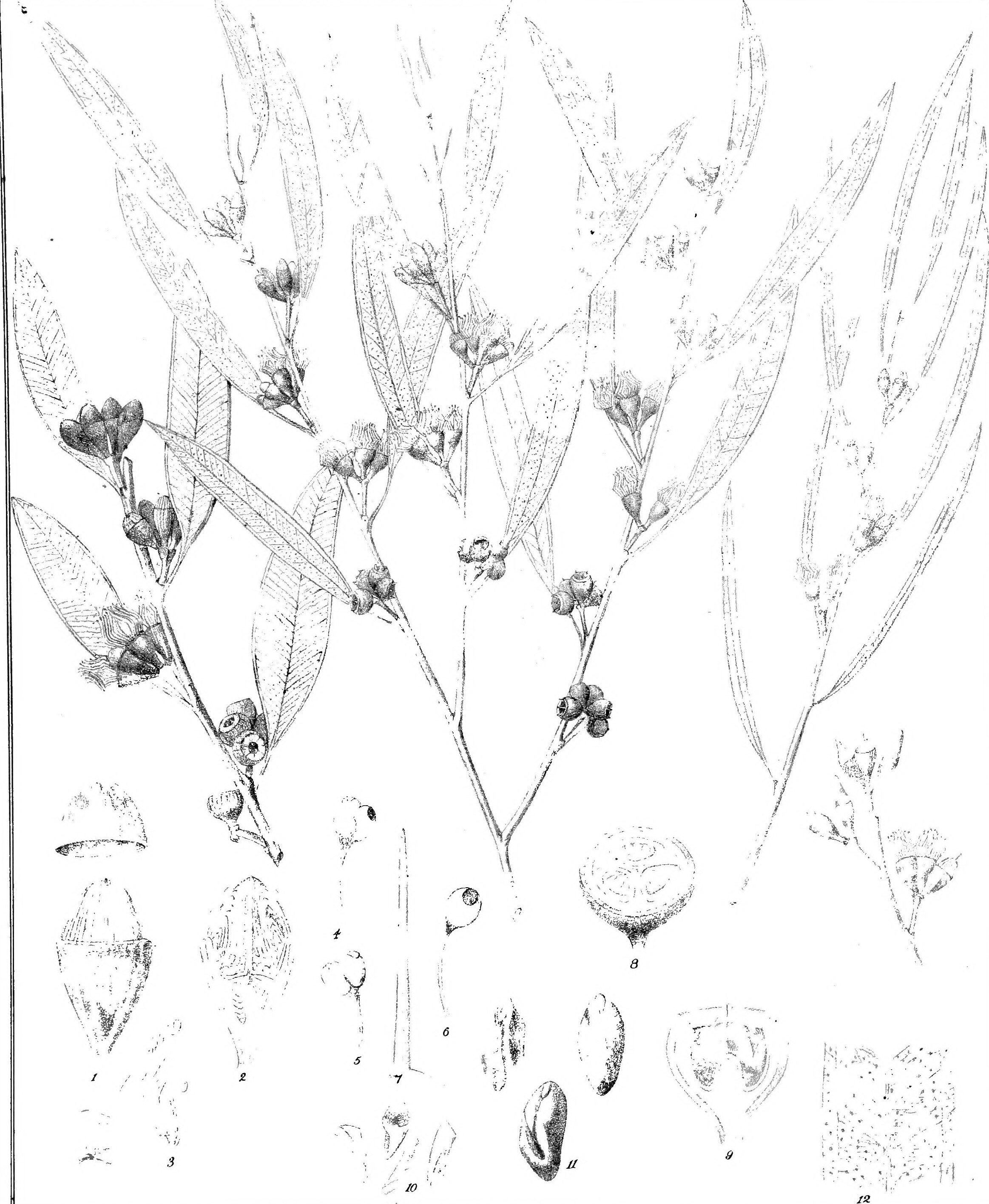
E. uncinta from Eucalyptographia

Eucalyptus uncinata, commonly known as the hook-leaved mallee, is a species of mallee that is endemic to the southwest of Western Australia. It has smooth bark, lance-shaped adult leaves, flower buds arranged in groups of nine to thirteen, creamy white flowers and barrel-shaped to oval or cylindrical fruit.

== Description ==
Eucalyptus uncinata is a mallee that typically grows to a height of 1–8 m (3 ft 3 in – 26 ft 3 in) and forms a lignotuber. It has smooth grey to light brown bark that is shed in short, curly strips, and sometimes a short stocking of fibrous bark near the base. Young plants and coppice regrowth have leaves in opposite pairs joined at their bases, each half-leaf egg-shaped to round, 17–55 mm (0.67–2.17 in) long and wide. Adult leaves are the same shade of glossy green on both sides, narrow lance-shaped to lance-shaped, 65–115 mm (2.6–4.5 in) long and 10–25 mm (0.39–0.98 in) wide, tapering to a petiole 7–25 mm (0.28–0.98 in) long. The flower buds are arranged in leaf axils in groups of nine, eleven or thirteen on a flattened, unbranched peduncle 3–20 mm (0.12–0.79 in) long, the individual buds sessile or on pedicels up to 2 mm (0.079 in) long. Mature buds are oval to spindle-shaped, 7–15 mm (0.28–0.59 in) and 3–5 mm (0.12–0.20 in) wide with a conical or rounded operculum about the same length as the floral cup. Flowering occurs between January and April and the flowers are creamy white. The fruit is a woody barrel-shaped, oval or cylindrical capsule 5–9 mm (0.20–0.35 in) and 4–8 mm (0.16–0.31 in) wide with the valves below rim level.

== Taxonomy ==
Eucalyptus uncinata was first formally described by the botanist Nikolai Turczaninow in 1849 in the journal Bulletin de la Société Impériale des Naturalistes de Moscou from specimens collected by James Drummond. The specific epithet (uncinata) is from the Latin word uncinatus meaning "barbed" or "hooked", referring to the fine tip of the leaves.

== Distribution and habitat ==
Hook-leaved mallee is found on coastal and sub-coastal sand plains and low hills between York, the Stirling Range, Salmon Gums and Israelite Bay, growing mostly in open shrubland.

The species is associated with the western mallee subgroup which is characterised by several eucalypts including Eucalyptus oleosa, Eucalyptus moderata, Eucalyptus incrassata, Eucalyptus foecunda, Eucalyptus redunca and Eucalyptus eremophila. The understorey is predominantly shrubby with species of Melaleuca and Acacia along with the occasional Triodia.

== Conservation status ==
This eucalypt is classified as "not threatened" by the Western Australian Government Department of Parks and Wildlife.

== See also ==
- List of Eucalyptus species
