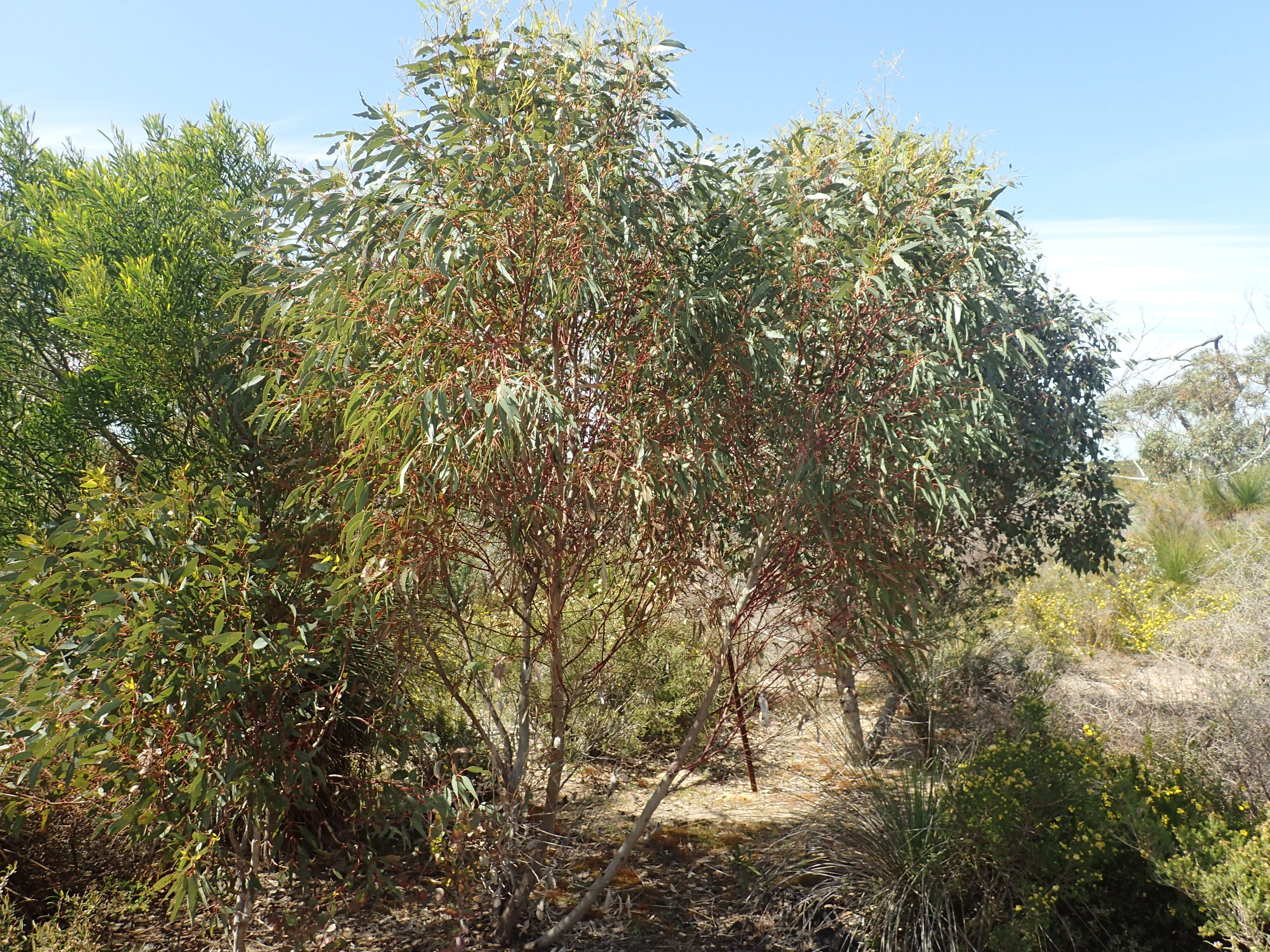
- Near Preston Beach

Conservation status
- Endangered (IUCN 3.1)

Scientific classification
- Kingdom: Plantae
- Clade: Tracheophytes
- Clade: Angiosperms
- Clade: Eudicots
- Clade: Rosids
- Order: Myrtales
- Family: Myrtaceae
- Genus: Eucalyptus
- Species: E. petrensis

Binomial name
- Eucalyptus petrensis Brooker & Hopper

= Eucalyptus petrensis =

Limestone mallee

Species of eucalyptus

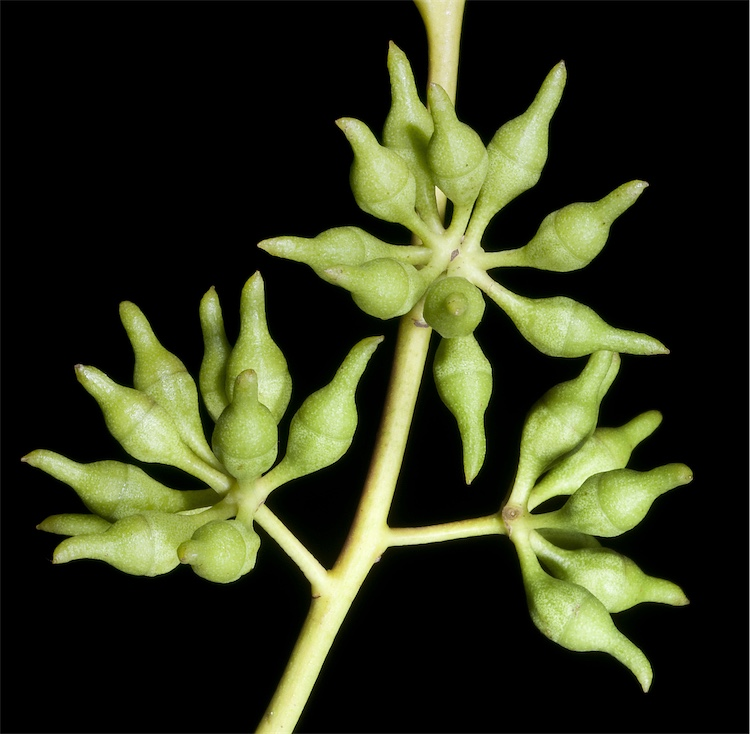
Flower buds

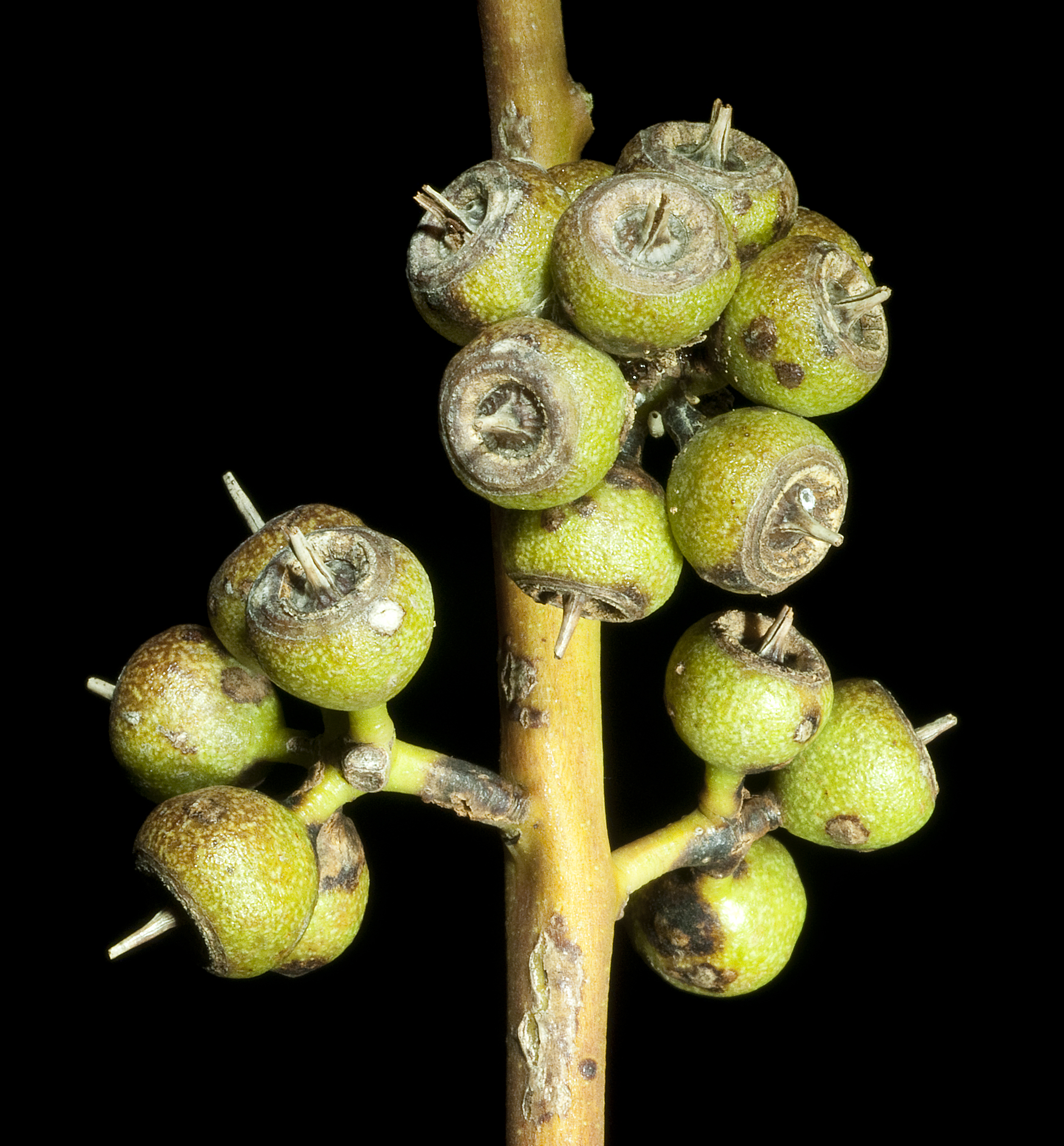
Fruit

Eucalyptus petrensis, commonly known as limestone mallee, straggly mallee or koodjat, is a species of straggly mallee that is endemic to Western Australia. It has mostly smooth bark, lance-shaped adult leaves, flower buds in groups of between seven and thirteen, creamy white flowers and more or less spherical fruit.

== Description ==
Eucalyptus petrensis is a straggly mallee that typically grows to a height of 1.5 to 4 metres (4.9 to 13.1 ft) and forms a lignotuber. It has smooth, light grey bark that is shed in strips, sometimes with rough bark at the base of the trunk. Young plants and coppice regrowth have dull green, egg-shaped leaves that are 45–110 mm (1.8–4.3 in) long and 30–50 mm (1.2–2.0 in) wide. Adult leaves are the same shade of glossy green on both sides, lance-shaped, 80–120 mm (3.1–4.7 in) long and 10–27 mm (0.39–1.06 in) wide, tapering to a petiole 4–15 mm (0.16–0.59 in) long. The flower buds are arranged in leaf axils in groups of between seven and thirteen on an unbranched peduncle 5–10 mm (0.20–0.39 in) long, the individual buds on pedicels 2–3 mm (0.079–0.118 in) long. Mature buds are 10–15 mm (0.39–0.59 in) long and 4–5 mm (0.16–0.20 in) wide with a beaked operculum that is two or three times as long as the floral cup. Flowering occurs from June to July or October and the flowers are creamy white. The fruit is a woody, more or less spherical capsule 5–8 mm (0.20–0.31 in) long and 7–10 mm (0.28–0.39 in) wide with the valves initially protruding but fragile.

The mallee has a similar appearance to Eucalyptus foecunda but E. petrensis has a more persistent style on the fruit.

== Taxonomy and naming ==
Eucalyptus petrensis was first formally described by the botanists Ian Brooker and Stephen Hopper in 1993 in the journal Nuytsia. The type material was collected by Brooker near Seabird in 1988. The specific epithet (petrensis) is a Latin word meaning "found among rocks".

== Distribution and habitat ==
Limestone mallee grows on thin, sandy soil on coastal limestone ridges, in shrubland dominated by Acacia species. It is restricted to coastal areas between Yalgorup National Park and Dongara.

== Conservation status ==
This eucalypt is classified as "not threatened" in Western Australia by the Western Australian Government Department of Parks and Wildlife. The IUCN Red List assesses the species as endangered.

== See also ==
- List of Eucalyptus species
