= Eucalyptus moderata =

Conservation status
- Vulnerable (IUCN 3.1)

Scientific classification
- Kingdom: Plantae
- Clade: Tracheophytes
- Clade: Angiosperms
- Clade: Eudicots
- Clade: Rosids
- Order: Myrtales
- Family: Myrtaceae
- Genus: Eucalyptus
- Species: E. moderata

Binomial name
- Eucalyptus moderata L.A.S.Johnson & K.D.Hill

Synonyms
- Eucalyptus dasyphloia D.Nicolle MS; Eucalyptus diemalensis D.Nicolle MS; Eucalyptus inconstans L.A.S.Johnson & K.D.Hill MS; Eucalyptus semivestita (L.A.S.Johnson & K.D.Hill) D.Nicolle MS; Eucalyptus transcontinentalis subsp. semivestita L.A.S.Johnson & K.D.Hill

Species of eucalyptus

Eucalyptus moderata, also known as redwood mallee, is a species of tree or a mallee that is endemic to the southwest of Western Australia. It has rough, hard, fibrous bark on some or all of the trunk, lance-shaped adult leaves, flower buds usually in groups of seven, pale yellow flowers and pendulous, urn-shaped fruit.

== Description ==
The tree typically grows to a height of 15 metres (49 ft) or shorter in mallee form with hard, scaly-fibrous, dark grey bark on the base of the tree which becomes a smooth white colour further up the tree. It forms a lignotuber and has glaucous branchlets. The concolorous, dull, blue-green to green adult leaves are arranged alternately. The leaf blade has a lanceolate shape with a length of 5 to 13 centimetres (2.0 to 5.1 in) and a width of 0.8 to 2.5 cm (0.31 to 0.98 in) with a that tapers to the petiole. It blooms between September and July producing cream-yellow flowers. Each unbranched axillary inflorescence usually has more than seven pedicellate buds. The mature buds have an ovoid to oblong shape with a length of 1.4 to 2.1 cm (0.55 to 0.83 in) and a width of 0.5 to 0.6 cm (0.197 to 0.236 in). The buds are scarred with a beaked to horn shaped operculum and pale yellow flowers. After flowering, erect to pendulous fruits form that are mostly urn shaped with a length of 0.6 to 1.0 cm (0.236 to 0.394 in) and a width of 0.5 to 0.8 cm (0.20 to 0.31 in). The fruits have a descending disc with three or four exserted valves. The brown-grey seeds within the fruit have an ovoid or flattened-ovoid shape.

== Taxonomy and naming ==
Eucalyptus moderata was first formally described in 1991 by the botanists Lawrence Alexander Sidney Johnson and Ken Hill in the journal Telopea. The specific epithet is taken from the Latin word moderatus meaning "moderate" in reference to the medium sized habit and leaves, buds and fruit of the plant compared to its closest relatives.

== Distribution ==
It is found on flats, slopes and road verges in the eastern Wheatbelt and the Goldfields-Esperance region growing in sandy-loamy soils over granite or laterite.

The species is associated with the western mallee subgroup which is characterised by several eucalypts including E. oleosa, E. eremophila, E. incrassata, E. foecunda, E. redunca and E. uncinata. The understorey is predominantly shrubby with species of Melaleuca and Acacia along with the occasional Triodia.

== See also ==
- List of Eucalyptus species
