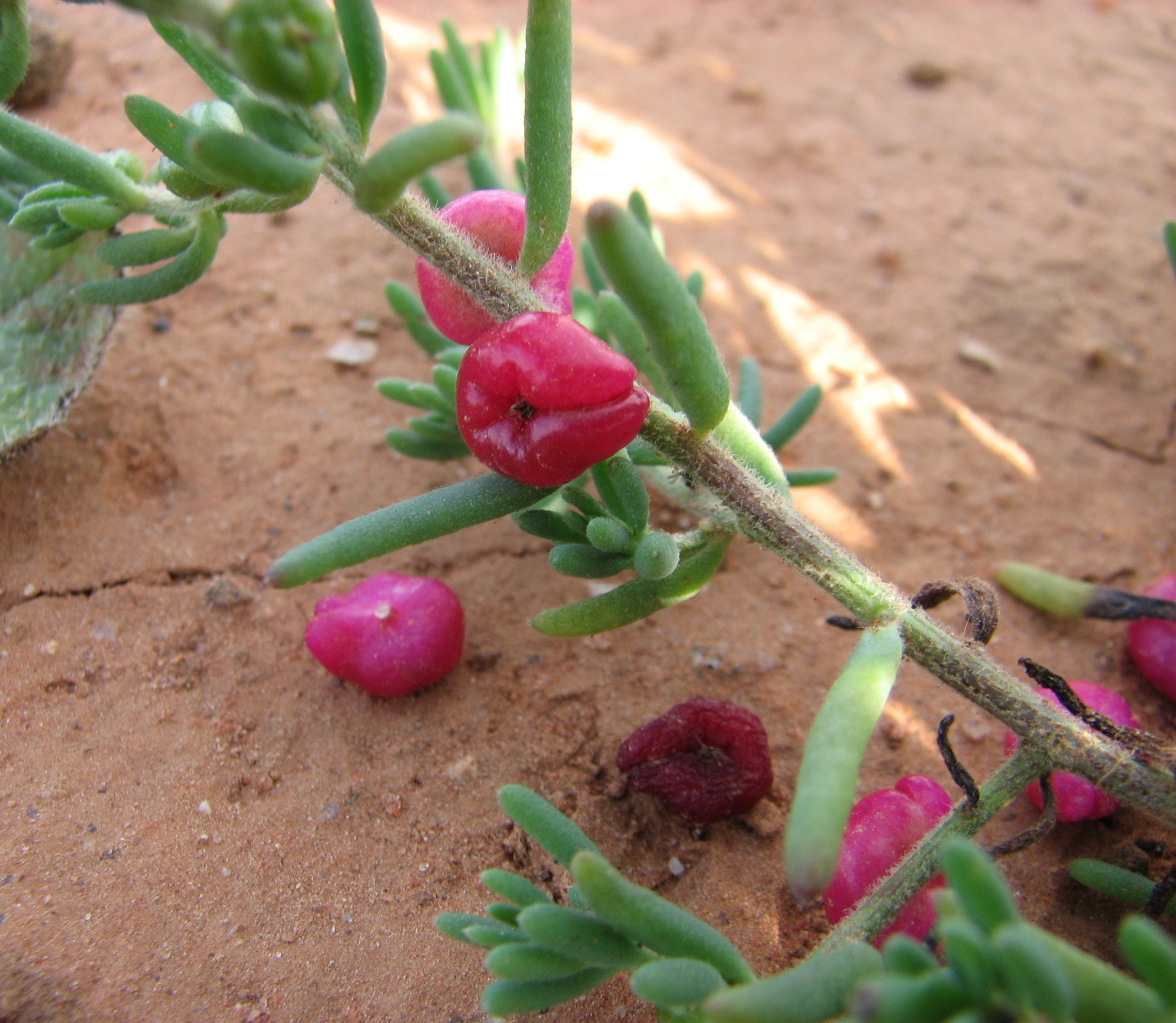
- Enchylaena tomentosa

Scientific classification
- Kingdom: Plantae
- Clade: Tracheophytes
- Clade: Angiosperms
- Clade: Eudicots
- Order: Caryophyllales
- Family: Amaranthaceae
- Subfamily: Camphorosmoideae
- Tribe: Camphorosmeae
- Genus: Enchylaena; R.Br.

Species
- Enchylaena lanata; Enchylaena tomentosa

= Enchylaena =

Genus of flowering plants

Enchylaena is a genus of two species of small perennial shrubs endemic to Australia. Plants of this genus are commonly known as barrier saltbushes.

The genus was published by Robert Brown in 1810, along with the species Enchylaena tomentosa. A number of putative species have been published since then, but all bar one have been transferred into other genera, or given synonymy with E. tomentosa. The exception is Enchylaena lanata, published by Paul G. Wilson in 1984.

Species List:

- Enchylaena lanata
- Enchylaena tomentosa

== Distribution ==
Enchylaena tomentosa is widely distributed throughout Australia. E. lanata is endemic to Western Australia.
