= Eupoecila miskini =

Scientific classification
- Domain: Eukaryota
- Kingdom: Animalia
- Phylum: Arthropoda
- Class: Insecta
- Order: Coleoptera
- Suborder: Polyphaga
- Infraorder: Scarabaeiformia
- Family: Scarabaeidae
- Subfamily: Cetoniinae
- Tribe: Schizorhinini
- Genus: Eupoecila
- Species: E. miskini

Binomial name
- Eupoecila miskini (Janson, 1876)

Species of beetle

Eupoecila miskini is a member of the scarab beetle family indigenous to Australia, belonging to genus Eupoecila. It is closely related to Eupoecila inscripta.
