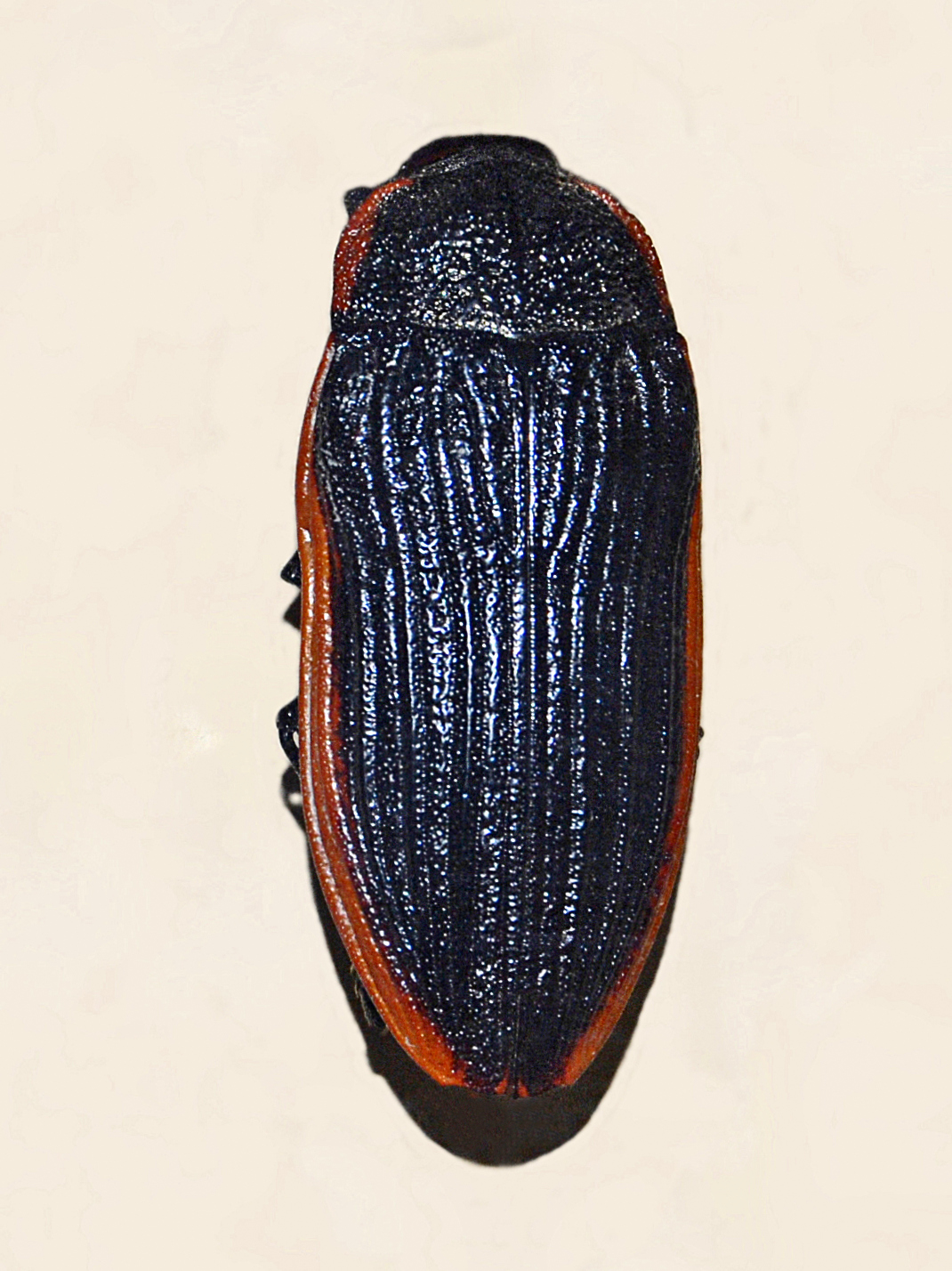
- Museum specimen

Scientific classification
- Domain: Eukaryota
- Kingdom: Animalia
- Phylum: Arthropoda
- Class: Insecta
- Order: Coleoptera
- Suborder: Polyphaga
- Infraorder: Elateriformia
- Family: Buprestidae
- Genus: Temognatha
- Species: T. grandis

Binomial name
- Temognatha grandis (Donovan, 1805)

Synonyms
- Buprestis grandis Donovan, 1805

= Temognatha grandis =

Species of beetle

Temognatha grandis is a species of beetle belonging to the family Buprestidae.

== Description ==
Temognatha grandis can reach a length of about 55 millimetres (2.2 in). The body colour is black, with a yellow border on each side. Head and legs are black. Elytra are punctato-striate. These beetles are florivore and feed on the flowers of various trees and shrubs (especially Angophora hispida and Leptospermum species). Larvae are wood-borers of Eucalyptus gracilis, Eucalyptus oleosa, Eucalyptus uncinata and Eucalyptus foecunda.

== Distribution and habitat ==
This species is present in New South Wales. These beetles can be found in drainage basins and coastal and oceanic zones.
