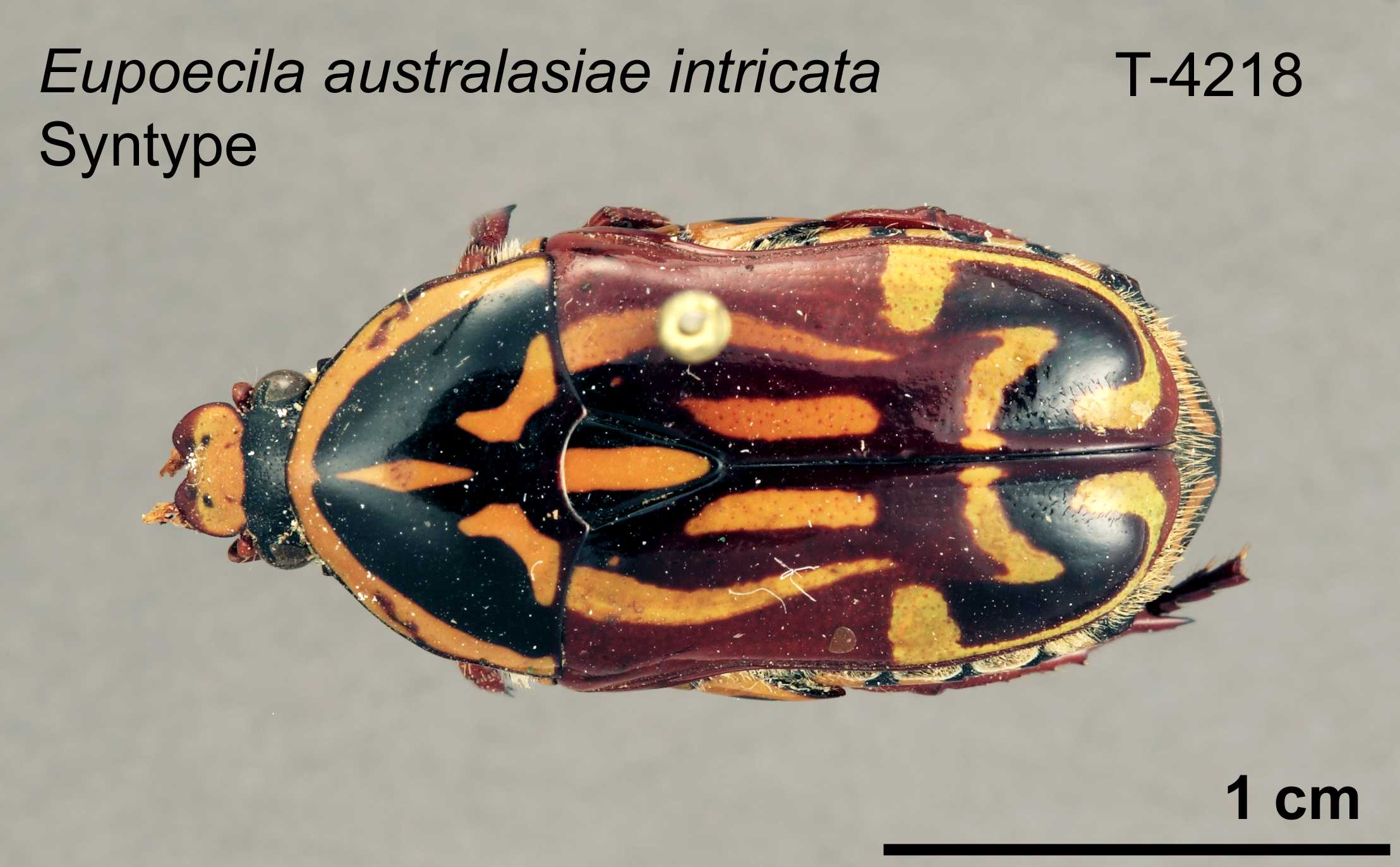
- E. intricata ♀ dorsal view.
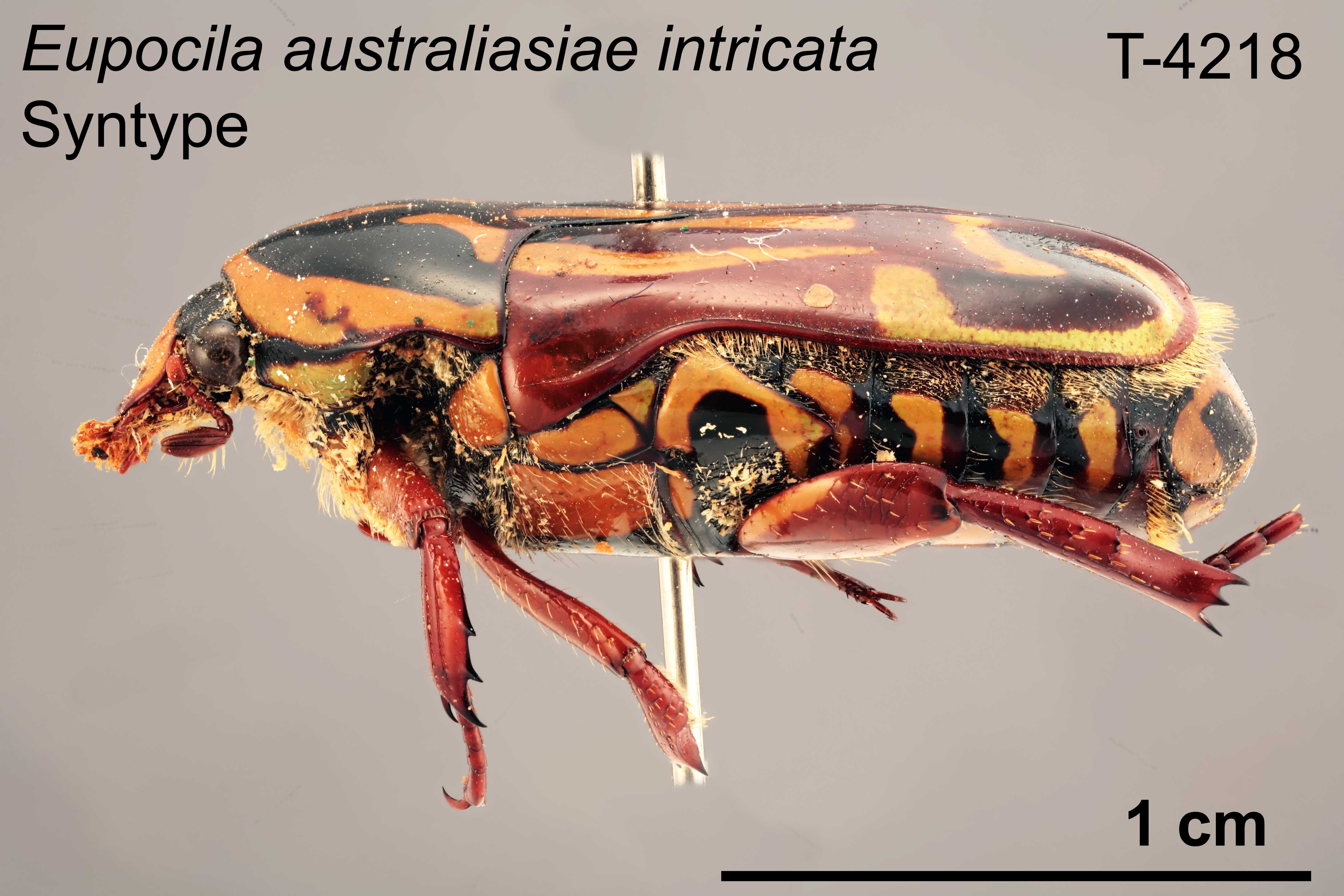
- E. intricata ♀ lateral view.

Scientific classification
- Domain: Eukaryota
- Kingdom: Animalia
- Phylum: Arthropoda
- Class: Insecta
- Order: Coleoptera
- Suborder: Polyphaga
- Infraorder: Scarabaeiformia
- Family: Scarabaeidae
- Subfamily: Cetoniinae
- Tribe: Schizorhinini
- Genus: Eupoecila
- Species: E. intricata

Binomial name
- Eupoecila intricata Lea, 1914

Synonyms
- Eupoecila australasiae intricata Lea, 1914

= Eupoecila intricata =

Species of beetle

Eupoecila intricata is a rare species of the Australian-endemic scarab beetle genus Eupoecila. E. intricata was described by Lea (1914) as a subspecies of E. australasiae and is still often confused with the species. It was raised to species status by Allard (1995).

== Description and diet ==
The body of this species carries cryptic, bright yellow or yellow-orange markings on a red and black background. In death, these markings fade to brown. The markings are similar to those of Eupoecila australasiae. Easily recognisable differences are two additional vertical lines where the wing covers meet, and two comma-shaped marks at the bottom of the pronotum rather than a horizontal line. E. intricata are slightly larger than E. australasiae.

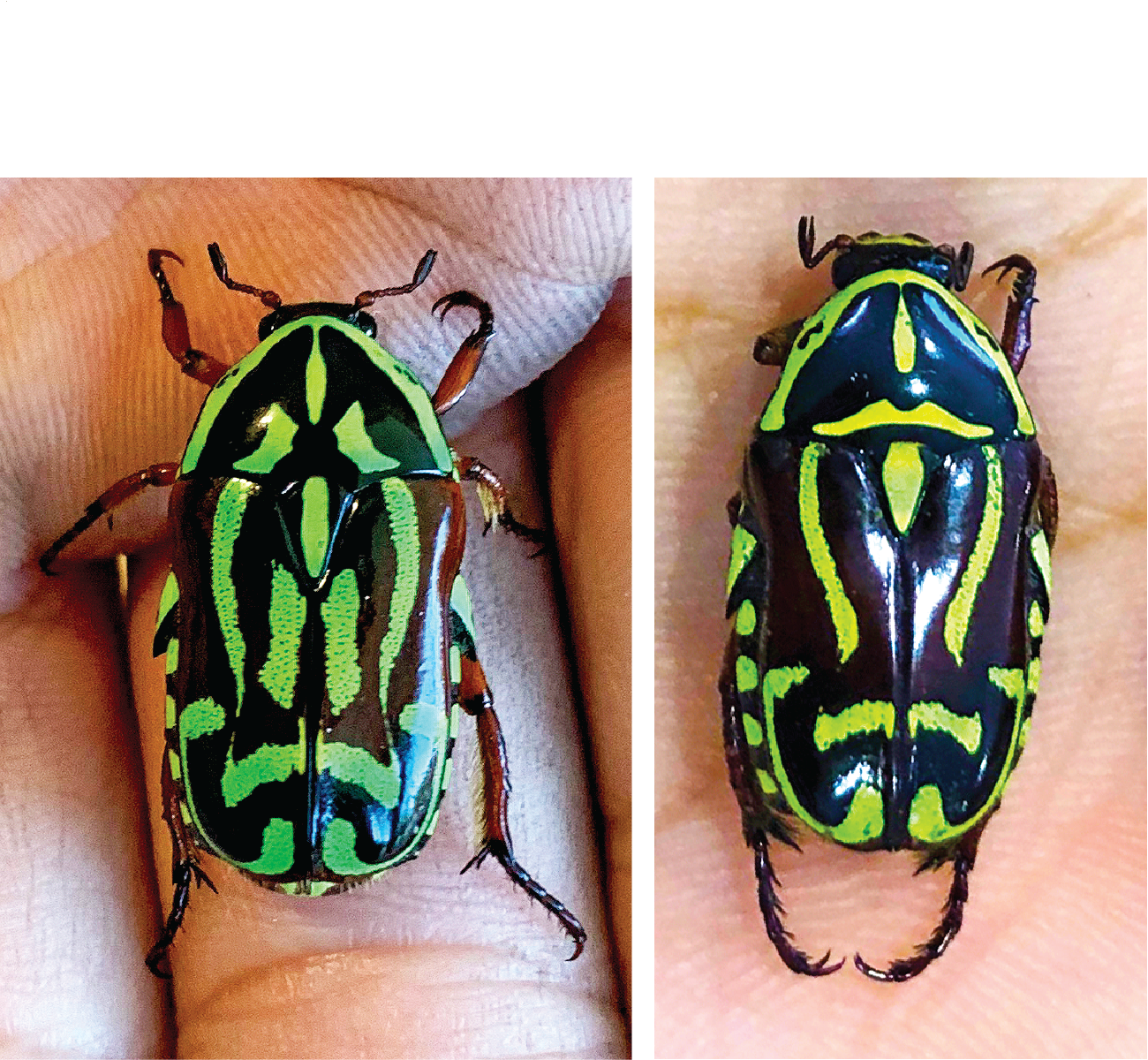

Comparison of Eupoecila intricata (left) with Eupoecila australasiae (right)

E. intricata feed on the pollen and nectar of flowering trees, such as eucalypts, Angophora and Ligustrum and contribute to the pollination of these trees and bushes.

== Habitat and occurrence ==
E. intricata is a rare species, which is evident from collection data and material in collections. Many of the records available on the internet are unverified. The species co-occurs with E. australasiae in Australia's Great Dividing Range and adjoining areas in east Queensland, New South Wales and Victoria. The life history of this species has not been published but is often assumed to be identical to E. australasiae.
