= Hylaeus trilobatus =

- A bee on Angophora hispida flowers

Scientific classification
- Kingdom: Animalia
- Phylum: Arthropoda
- Clade: Pancrustacea
- Class: Insecta
- Order: Hymenoptera
- Family: Colletidae
- Genus: Hylaeus
- Species: H. trilobatus

Binomial name
- Hylaeus trilobatus (Cockerell, 1910)

Synonyms
- Prosopis trilobata Cockerell, 1910; Prosopis melanops Cockerell, 1916; Prosopis centralis Friese, 1924; Hylaeus (Prosopisteron) melanops crassior Cockerell, 1926

Species of bee

Hylaeus trilobatus, or Hylaeus (Planihylaeus) trilobatus, is a species of bee in the family Colletidae and subfamily Hylaeinae. It is endemic to Australia. It was described by British-American entomologist Theodore Dru Alison Cockerell in 1910.

== Description ==
Male body length is about 6 mm. Integumental colouration is mainly black, with yellow markings.

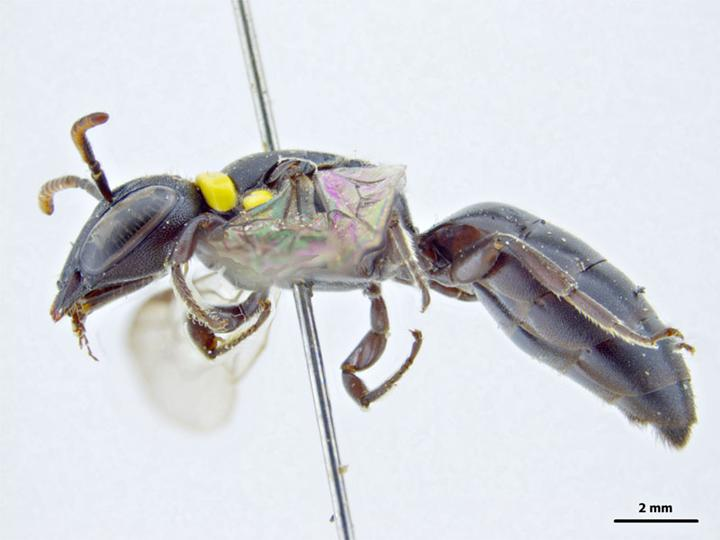
Female

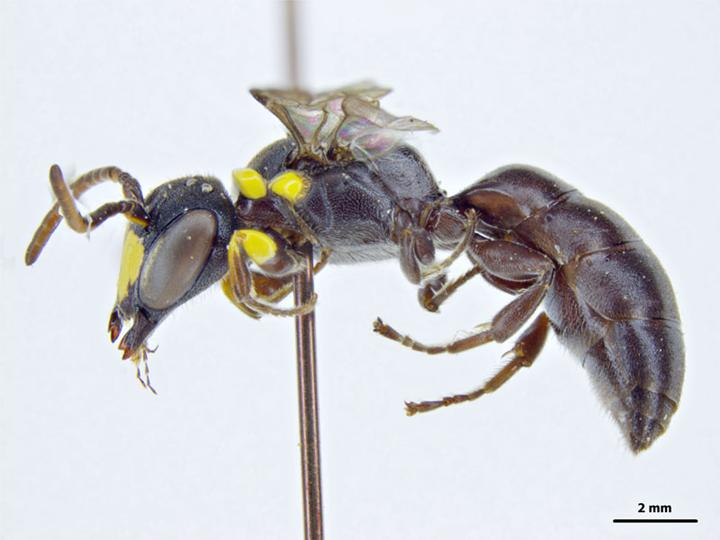
Male

== Distribution and habitat ==
The species occurs in south-eastern mainland Australia. Type localities include Caloundra in south-eastern Queensland, as well as the Victorian Mallee, the Dandenong Ranges and Bayswater, Victoria.

== Behaviour ==
The adults are flying mellivores. Flowering plants visited by the bees include Daviesia, Jacksonia, Melaleuca, Pultenaea and Rubus species.
