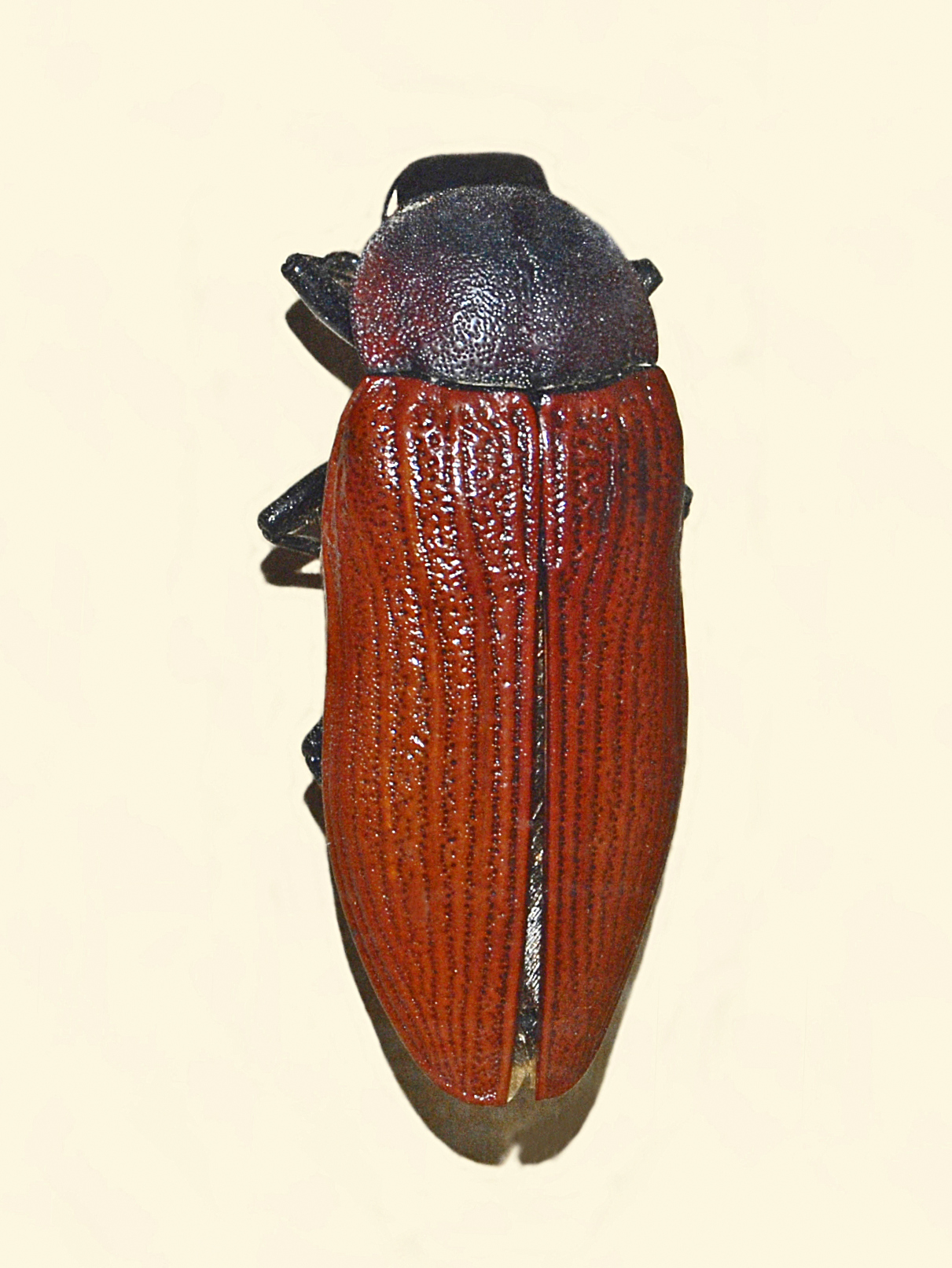
- Museum specimen

Scientific classification
- Kingdom: Animalia
- Phylum: Arthropoda
- Clade: Pancrustacea
- Class: Insecta
- Order: Coleoptera
- Suborder: Polyphaga
- Infraorder: Elateriformia
- Family: Buprestidae
- Genus: Temognatha
- Species: T. heros

Binomial name
- Temognatha heros Géhin, 1855

= Temognatha heros =

Species of beetle

Temognatha heros, the yellow jewel beetle or large jewel beetle, is a species of beetles belonging to the family Buprestidae.

== Description ==
Temognatha heros can reach a length of about 60–80 millimetres (2.4–3.1 in). It is the biggest within the genus Temognatha. The basic body colour is yellowish-orange, while pronotum is dark reddish. Elytra are punctato-striate. Legs show a metallic blue color.

The adults feed on the flowers of various trees and shrubs (especially Eucalyptus leptophylla, Eucalyptus foecunda, Melaleuca pauperiflora and Melaleuca uncinata.

Larvae are wood-borers of Casuarina species, Eucalyptus gracilis, Eucalyptus oleosa, Eucalyptus foecunda and Melaleuca uncinata.

== Distribution ==
This species is present in South and Western Australia (New South Wales and Victoria). These beetles can be found in drainage basins and coastal and oceanic zones.
