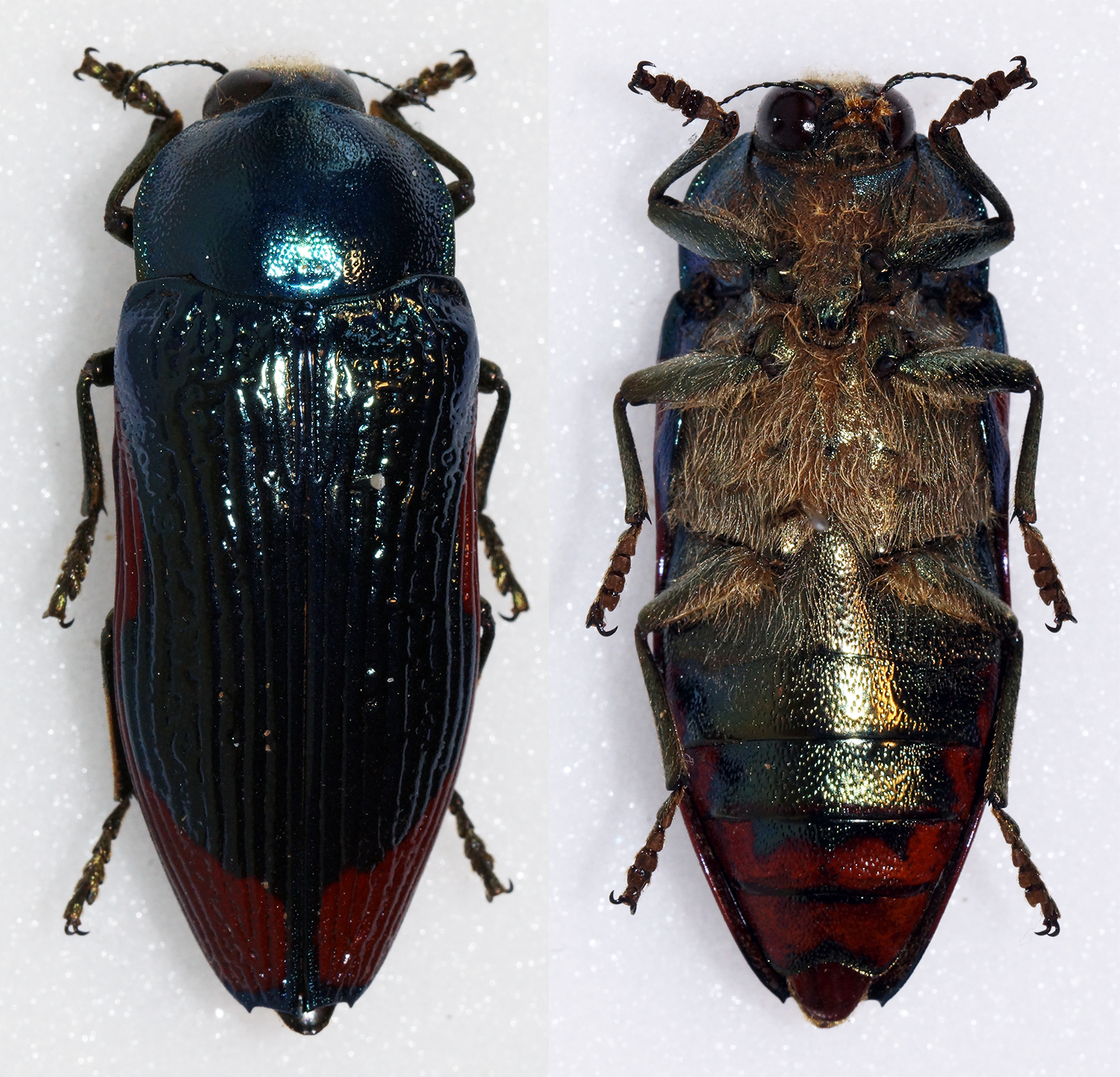

Scientific classification
- Kingdom: Animalia
- Phylum: Arthropoda
- Clade: Pancrustacea
- Class: Insecta
- Order: Coleoptera
- Suborder: Polyphaga
- Infraorder: Elateriformia
- Family: Buprestidae
- Genus: Temognatha
- Species: T. miranda

Binomial name
- Temognatha miranda (Carter, 1927)

Synonyms
- Stigmodera miranda Carter, 1927

= Temognatha miranda =

Species of beetle

Temognatha miranda is a jewel beetle in the family Buprestidae, found in Western Australia. It was first described in 1927 by Herbert James Carter as Stigmodera miranda.

The adults are diurnal, and eat flowers, in particular, those of Eucalyptus foecunda, Eucalyptus uncinata and other Eucalyptus species. The larvae are wood-borers.

== See also ==
- Woodboring beetle
