= Temognatha affinis =

Scientific classification
- Kingdom: Animalia
- Phylum: Arthropoda
- Clade: Pancrustacea
- Class: Insecta
- Order: Coleoptera
- Suborder: Polyphaga
- Infraorder: Elateriformia
- Family: Buprestidae
- Genus: Temognatha
- Species: T. affinis

Binomial name
- Temognatha affinis (Saunders, 1868)

Synonyms
- Stigmodera affinis Saunders

Species of beetle

Temognatha affinis is a jewel beetle in the family Buprestidae, found in New South Wales. It was first described in 1868 by Edward Saunders as Stigmodera affinis.

The adults are diurnal, and eat flowers. The larvae are wood-borers.

== See also ==
- Woodboring beetle
