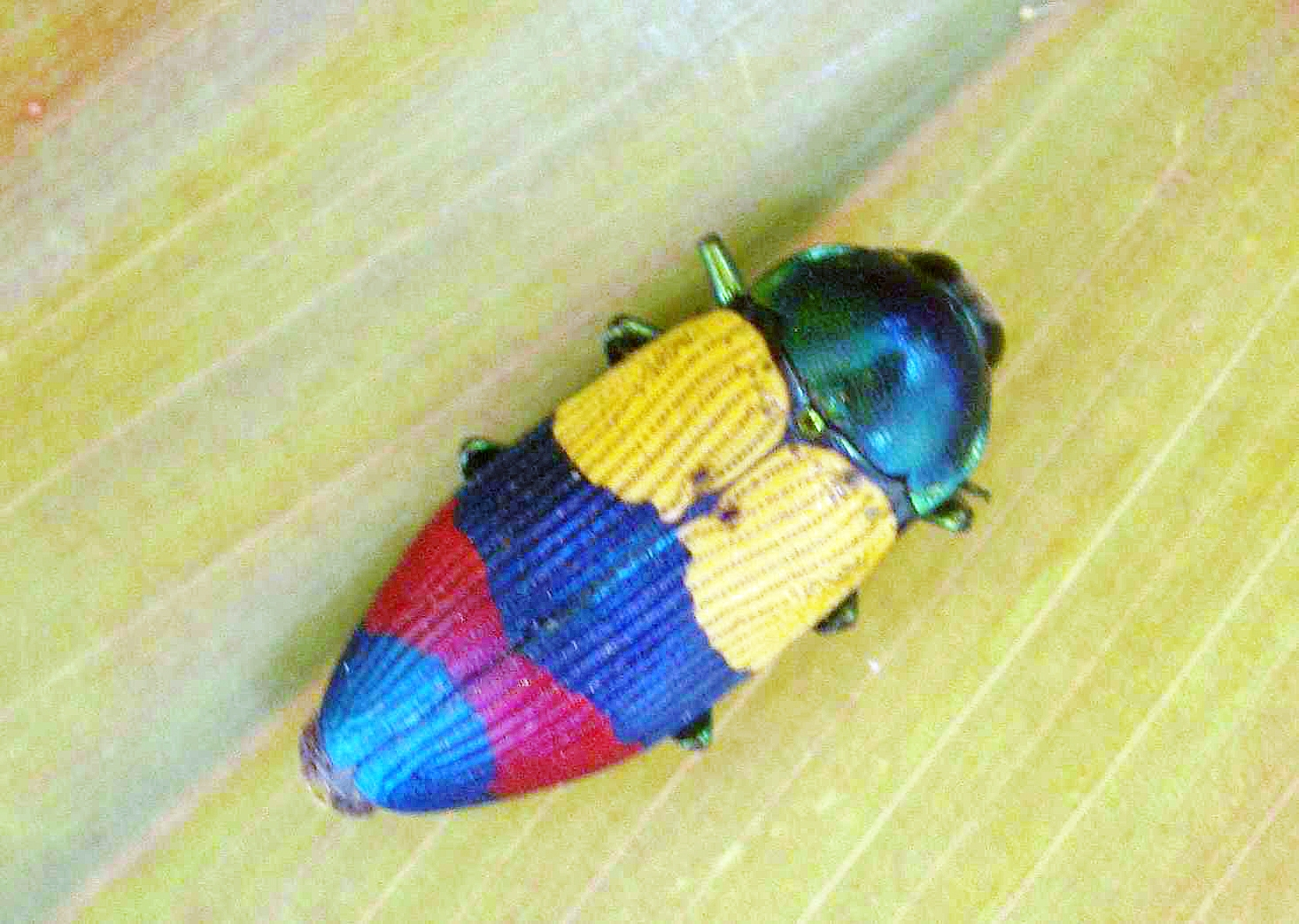
- Temognatha alternata Cooktown, Australia

Scientific classification
- Domain: Eukaryota
- Kingdom: Animalia
- Phylum: Arthropoda
- Class: Insecta
- Order: Coleoptera
- Suborder: Polyphaga
- Infraorder: Elateriformia
- Family: Buprestidae
- Genus: Temognatha
- Species: T. alternata

Binomial name
- Temognatha alternata Lumholtz, 1889

= Temognatha alternata =

Species of beetle

Temognatha alternata is endemic to Queensland, Australia. Little is known of this spectacular beetle which has never been formally described, as the name is taken from that given by Lumholtz (1889, 1890) without any description.

== Description ==
Temognatha alternata grows to 26 mm. It is easily recognisable with its bright yellow and red bands on greenish-blue elytra. The head and thorax are dark blue-green. The elytra are lined with rows of fine pits along their length giving them a furrowed appearance.

== Biology and habitat ==
There are no recorded larval host-plants. The adult host-plants include: Eucalyptus gummifera and E. polycarpa.

"Lumholtz (1889: p. 197, 1980: p. 239) briefly noted that he collected adults of this species [cited as Stigmodera alternata] amongst grass (?) near the Herbert River, northern Queensland near the end of December 1882; it is obvious that Lumholtz must have collected dead or dying beetles since these buprestids do not inhabit nor feed on grasses. Nothing further was recorded on the biology of this species until Brooks (1948) recorded adults [as Castiarina alternata Lumh.] feeding from the flowers of Eucalyptus gummifera (Gaertn.) Hochr. in the Cairns-Mareeba area of north-eastern Queensland. Later Brooks (1969) recorded this species [as Castiarina alternata Lumh.] feeding from the flowers of Eucalyptus polycarpa F. Muell. [cited incorrectly as Eucalyptus polycarpha F.v.M.] in the Bowen-Ayr-Mt. Molloy area of north-eastern Queensland. Life-stages: The egg, larva and pupa have not been described. Published collection records with biological data: None available."

== See also ==
- Woodboring beetle
