= Chondropyga gulosa =

Scientific classification
- Kingdom: Animalia
- Phylum: Arthropoda
- Clade: Pancrustacea
- Class: Insecta
- Order: Coleoptera
- Suborder: Polyphaga
- Infraorder: Scarabaeiformia
- Family: Scarabaeidae
- Genus: Chondropyga
- Species: C. gulosa

Binomial name
- Chondropyga gulosa (Janson, 1873)

Species of beetle

Chondropyga gulosa is a species of beetle of the family Scarabaeidae native to Australia described by Oliver Erichson Janson in 1873.
