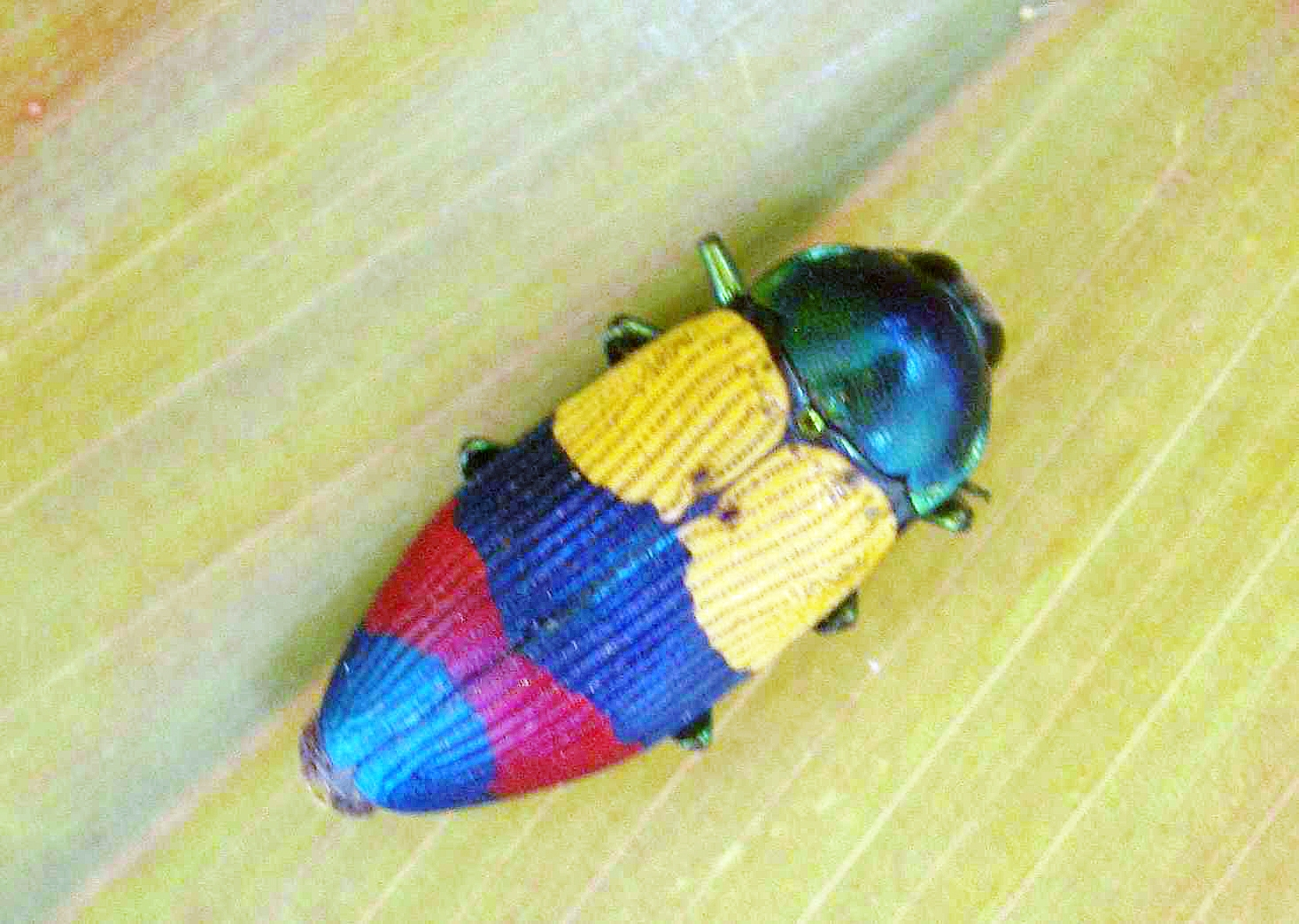
- Temognatha alternata

Scientific classification
- Domain: Eukaryota
- Kingdom: Animalia
- Phylum: Arthropoda
- Class: Insecta
- Order: Coleoptera
- Suborder: Polyphaga
- Infraorder: Elateriformia
- Family: Buprestidae
- Tribe: Stigmoderini
- Genus: Temognatha; Solier, 1833

Species
- 85+

= Temognatha =

Genus of beetles

Temognatha is a genus of metallic wood-boring beetles. Over 85 species in the genus are native to Australia.

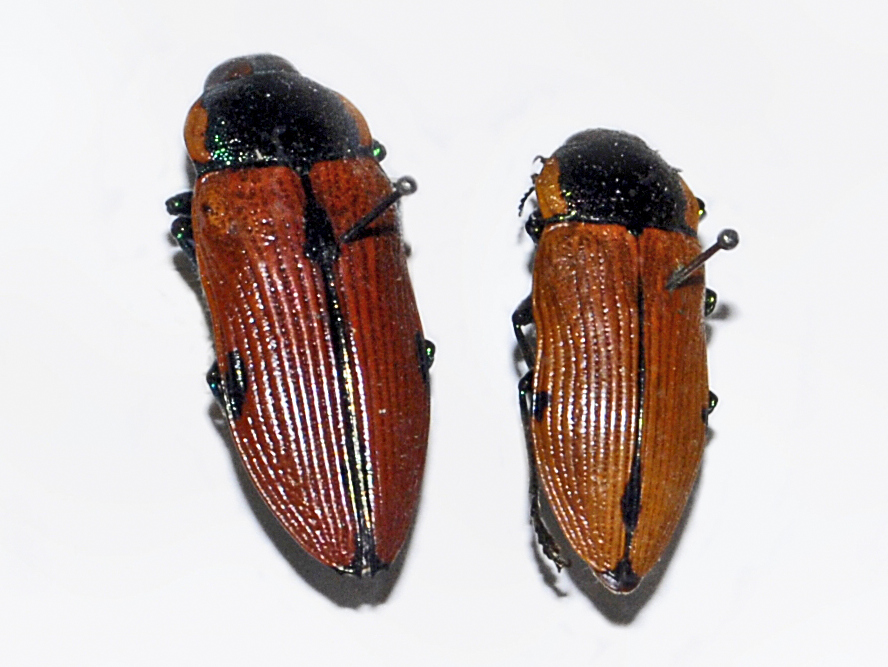
Temognatha variabilis

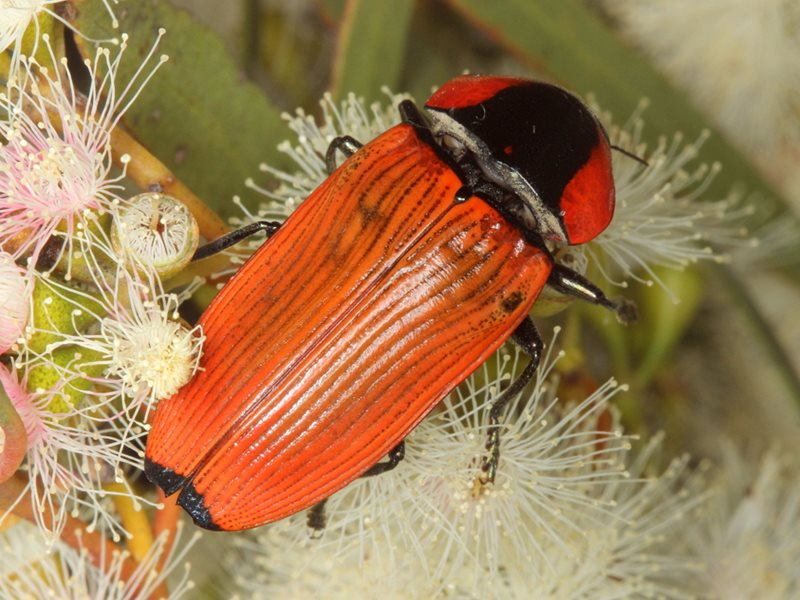
Temognatha sanguiniventris

== Species ==
Species include:

- Temognatha aestimata (Kerremans, 1898)
- Temognatha affinis (Saunders, 1868)
- Temognatha alternata (Lumholtz, 1889)
- Temognatha apicenigra (Théry, 1937)
- Temognatha aquilonia Peterson, 1991
- Temognatha barbiventris (Carter, 1916)
- Temognatha bonvouloirii (Saunders, 1868)
- Temognatha bruckii (Thomson, 1878)
- Temognatha carinicollis (Théry, 1937)
- Temognatha carpentariae (Blackburn, 1892)
- Temognatha chalcodera (Thomson, 1878)
- Temognatha chevrolatii Géhin, 1855
- Temognatha coelestis (Thomson, 1857)
- Temognatha congener (Saunders, 1869)
- Temognatha conspicillata (White, 1843)
- Temognatha coronata (Peterson, 1982)
- Temognatha donovani (Gory & Laporte, 1838)
- Temognatha duboulayi (Saunders, 1872)
- Temognatha ducalis (Carter, 1927)
- Temognatha duponti (Boisduval, 1835)
- Temognatha excisicollis (Macleay, 1863)
- Temognatha flavicollis (Saunders, 1869)
- Temognatha flavocincta (Gory & Laporte, 1838)
- Temognatha flavomarginata (Gemminger & Harold, 1869)
- Temognatha fortnumii (Hope, 1843)
- Temognatha franca (Carter, 1916)
- Temognatha fusca (Saunders, 1871)
- Temognatha gemmelli (Deuquet, 1947)
- Temognatha gigas (Carter, 1916)
- Temognatha gloriosa (Carter, 1916)
- Temognatha gordonburnsi Barker, 1993
- Temognatha goryi (Gory & Laporte, 1838)
- Temognatha grandis (Donovan, 1805)
- Temognatha haematica (Hope, 1846)
- Temognatha heros Géhin, 1855
- Temognatha imperialis (Carter, 1916)
- Temognatha jakobsoni (Obenberger, 1928)
- Temognatha jansonii (Saunders, 1868)
- Temognatha latithorax (Thomson, 1857)
- Temognatha lessonii (Gory, 1841)
- Temognatha limbata (Donovan, 1805)
- Temognatha lobicollis (Saunders, 1868)
- Temognatha macfarlani (Waterhouse, 1881)
- Temognatha maculiventris (Macleay, 1863)
- Temognatha marcida (Blackburn, 1892)
- Temognatha marginalis (Carter, 1929)
- Temognatha martinii (Saunders, 1869)
- Temognatha menalcas (Thomson, 1879)
- Temognatha miranda (Carter, 1927)
- Temognatha mitchellii (Hope, 1846)
- Temognatha mnizechii (Saunders, 1868)
- Temognatha murrayi (Gemminger & Harold, 1869)
- Temognatha nickerli (Obenberger, 1922)
- Temognatha nigrofasciata (Théry, 1937)
- Temognatha obesissima (Thomson, 1879)
- Temognatha obscuripennis (Mannerheim, 1837)
- Temognatha oleata (Blackburn, 1894)
- Temognatha parvicollis (Saunders, 1869)
- Temognatha pascoei (Saunders, 1868)
- Temognatha pictipes (Blackburn, 1894)
- Temognatha pubicollis (Waterhouse, 1874)
- Temognatha punctatostriata (Saunders, 1868)
- Temognatha rectipennis (Blackburn, 1891)
- Temognatha regia (Blackburn, 1892)
- Temognatha reichei (Gory & Laporte, 1838)
- Temognatha rubra (Théry, 1937)
- Temognatha rufocyanea (Carter, 1916)
- Temognatha sanguinea (Saunders, 1869)
- Temognatha sanguineocincta (Saunders, 1868)
- Temognatha sanguinipennis (Gory & Laporte, 1838)
- Temognatha sanguiniventris (Saunders, 1868)
- Temognatha secularis (Thomson, 1857)
- Temognatha sexmaculata (Saunders, 1868)
- Temognatha similis (Saunders, 1868)
- Temognatha spencii (Gory & Laporte, 1838)
- Temognatha stevensii Gehin, 1855
- Temognatha suturalis (Donovan, 1805)
- Temognatha thoracica (Saunders, 1868)
- Temognatha tricolorata (Waterhouse, 1874)
- Temognatha variabilis (Donovan, 1805)
- Temognatha viridescens Barker, 1995
- Temognatha viridicincta (Waterhouse, 1874)
- Temognatha vitticollis (Macleay, 1863)
- Temognatha westwoodii (Saunders, 1868)
- Temognatha wimmerae (Blackburn, 1890)
