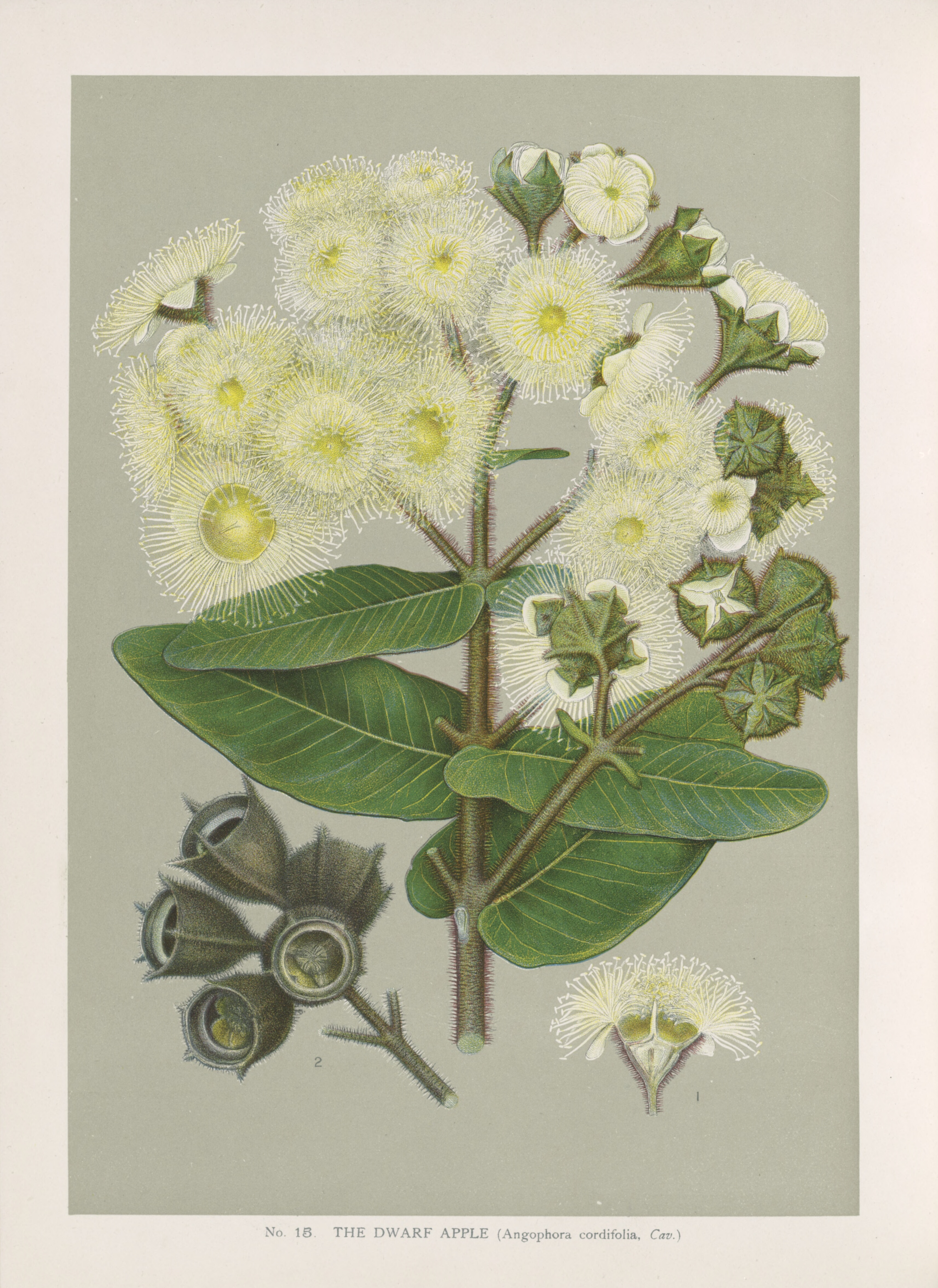

Conservation status
- Near Threatened (IUCN 3.1)

Scientific classification
- Kingdom: Plantae
- Clade: Tracheophytes
- Clade: Angiosperms
- Clade: Eudicots
- Clade: Rosids
- Order: Myrtales
- Family: Myrtaceae
- Genus: Angophora
- Species: A. hispida

Binomial name
- Angophora hispida (Sm.) Blaxell
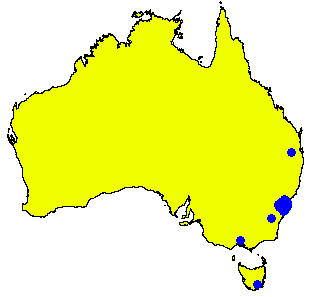
- Occurrence data from AVH

Synonyms
- Eucalyptus hispida (Sm.) Brooker; Angophora cordifolia Cav.

= Angophora hispida =

Species of tree

Angophora hispida grows as a mallee, or as a tree to about 7 m (23 ft) in height. Its small size, especially when compared to its Angophora and Eucalyptus relatives, leads to it being known by the common name dwarf apple. It is native to a relatively small patch of central New South Wales – from just south of Sydney up to the Gosford area. The plant's leaves are sessile (stalk-less) and hug the stem with heart-shaped bases. Its previous name – A. cordifolia – referred to these cordate leaves. Another distinctive feature is the red bristly hairs that cover the branchlets, flower bases and new growth. This leads to the specific epithet hispida (meaning 'bristly').

== Description ==
Dwarf apple grows as a small tree or mallee to 7 m (23 ft) high. It has greyish flaky bark. Like other members of the genus Angophora and unlike other eucalypts, the leaves are arranged oppositely along the stem. Sitting on petiole 0–4 mm long, the leaves are ovate to elliptic in shape, and measure 5–10 cm (2.0–3.9 in) in length and 3–4.5 cm (1.2–1.8 in) across, with a blunt rounded apex, and a cordate (heart-shaped) base. They are pale yellow-green above and greyish on their undersurface. New growth is covered in reddish hairs. Flowering takes place from November to January. The showy creamy-white flower heads are terminal and umbellate, each composed of three to seven flowers on 0.8–3.2 cm (0.31–1.26 in) long pedicels, which in turn branch off from a 1.5–7 cm (0.59–2.76 in) long peduncle. Like the new leaves and stems, developing buds are covered in reddish hair. Globular in shape with longitudinal ribbing, they grow to a diameter of 0.9–1.3 cm (0.35–0.51 in).

The flowers fall leaving the cup-shaped woody seed pods or fruit, which measure 1.5–2.6 cm (0.59–1.02 in) long and 1.3–2 cm (0.51–0.79 in) in diameter. These shed the mature seed in February and March. The oval-shaped seeds are brown and flat, measuring 0.8–1 cm (0.31–0.39 in) long.

== Taxonomy ==
Common names include dwarf apple and scrub apple, and banda in the Cadigal language.

Loddiges Nursery called it the Rough Metrosideros after the dwarf apple was described by James Edward Smith in 1797 as Metrosideros hispida, having been collected by Surgeon-General of New South Wales, John White in 1795. Antonio José Cavanilles also described it the same year as Angophora cordifolia, having been collected somewhere near the shoreline in Port Jackson. The latter name remained in use until 1976, when A. hispida was erected by Don Blaxell, who had established that Smith's name had been published four months earlier in May (contrasting with Cavanillles in September) of 1797.

Smith had been sent a specimen by Surgeon-General White, which flowered in 1798. He went on to publish a fuller description accompanied by an illustration by James Sowerby in 1805.

Kevin Thiele and Pauline Ladiges published a phylogenetic study based on morphology and came up with the smudgy apple (Angophora woodsiana) as the dwarf apple's closest relative. Brooker and colleagues consider it to be more closely related to the broad-leaved apple (A. subvelutina).

More recently, genetic work has been published showing Angophora to be more closely related to Eucalyptus than Corymbia, and the name Eucalyptus hispida has been proposed for this species if it were to be placed in the eucalypt genus.

Hybrids with Angophora costata and A. bakeri have been recorded.

== Distribution and habitat ==
Dwarf apple is found only in the Sydney Basin, as far south as O’Hares Creek off the Georges River, on dry sandstone soils low in nutrients. The associated plant communities are heath, scrubland or open woodland, with such species as scribbly gums (Eucalyptus racemosa and E. haemastoma), red bloodwood (Corymbia gummifera), narrow-leaved apple (Angophora bakeri), heath banksia (Banksia ericifolia), rusty banksia (B. oblongifolia), silver banksia (B. marginata), conesticks (Petrophile pulchella), scrub sheoak (Allocasuarina distyla), wax flower (Eriostemon australasius) and parrot pea (Dillwynia floribunda). It grows from sea level to an altitude of 300 m (980 ft) and with an annual rainfall of 800 to 1,600 mm (31 to 63 in).

== Ecology ==
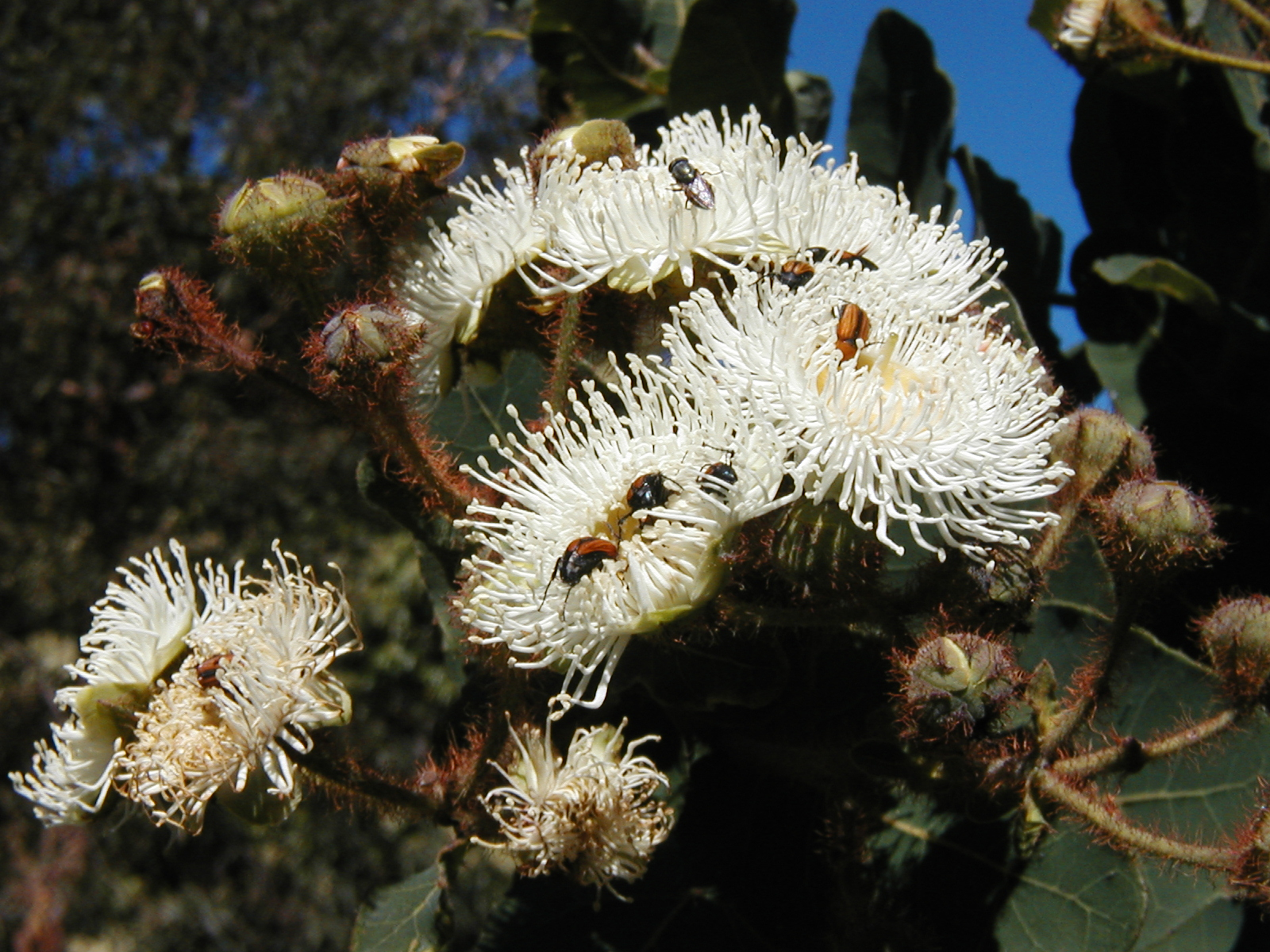
Insects foraging among the flowerheads

Dwarf apple regenerates from bushfire by resprouting from its woody base, known as a lignotuber, or epicormic shoots. It can flower within a year of being burnt and plays an important role as a food source for nectar-eating insects after bushfire.

The flowers attract birds, such as the noisy miner and wattlebirds, and a wide variety of insects, including honeybees, native bees, flies, moths and butterflies, and a wide array of beetles, including the rose chafer (Eupoecila australasiae), green-velvet flower chafer (Glycyphana brunnipes), the variable jewel beetle (Temognatha variabilis), the cowboy beetle (Chondropyga dorsalis), and a scarab beetle Bisallardiana gymnopleura, as well as members of the scarab genus Phyllotocus and soldier beetle genus Telephorus.

The dwarf apple is a host for larvae of froghoppers, known as spittlebugs.

Angophora hispida has been recorded as a host for the mistletoe species Muellerina eucalyptoides.

== Use in horticulture ==
This is a small tree suitable for larger gardens, its red new growth and profuse white flowers are attractive horticultural features. Flowering in summer, the flowers attract brightly coloured beetles. It requires a sunny aspect and good drainage to grow well.

== Gallery ==
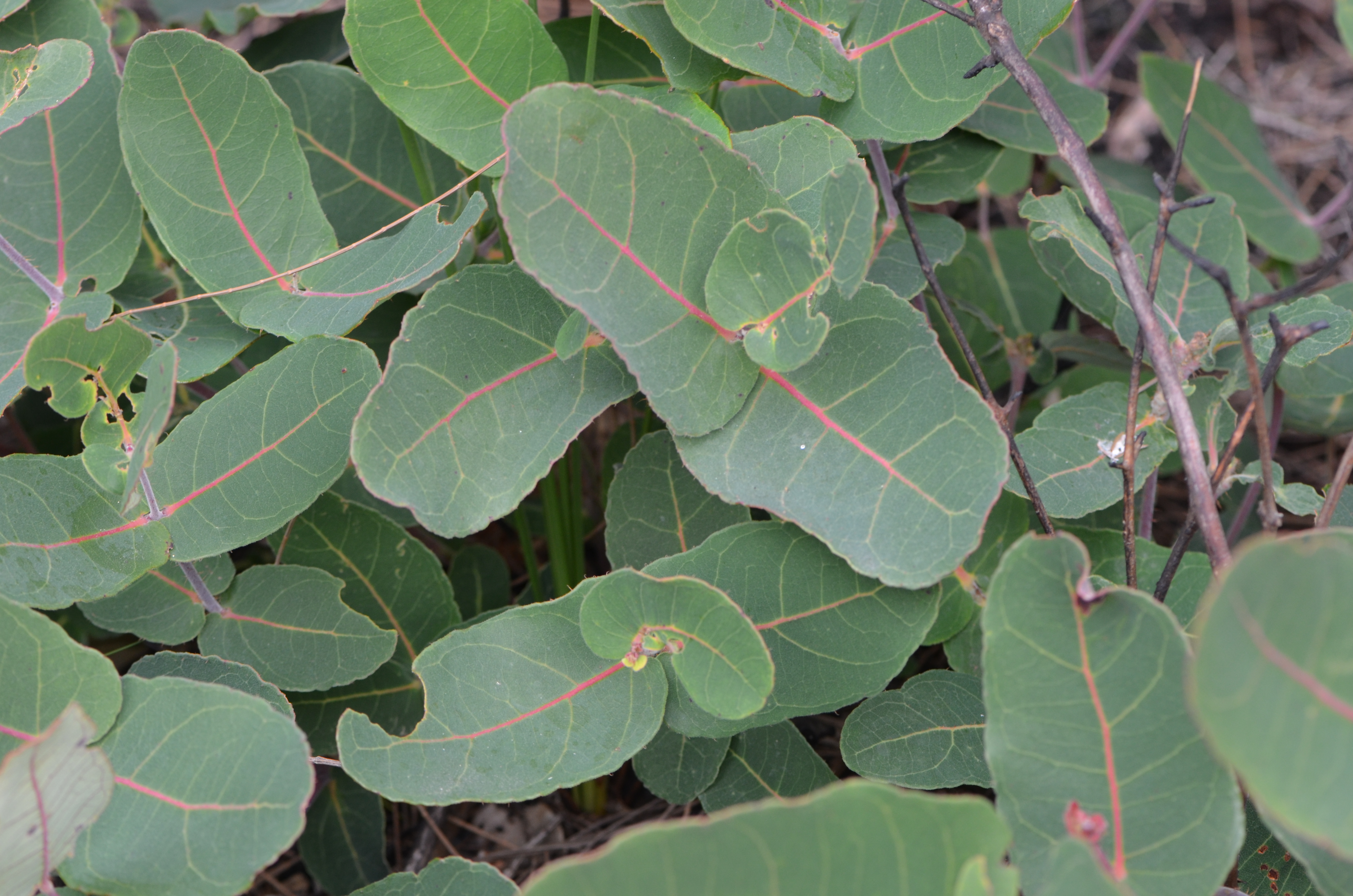
Opposite & decussate leaves

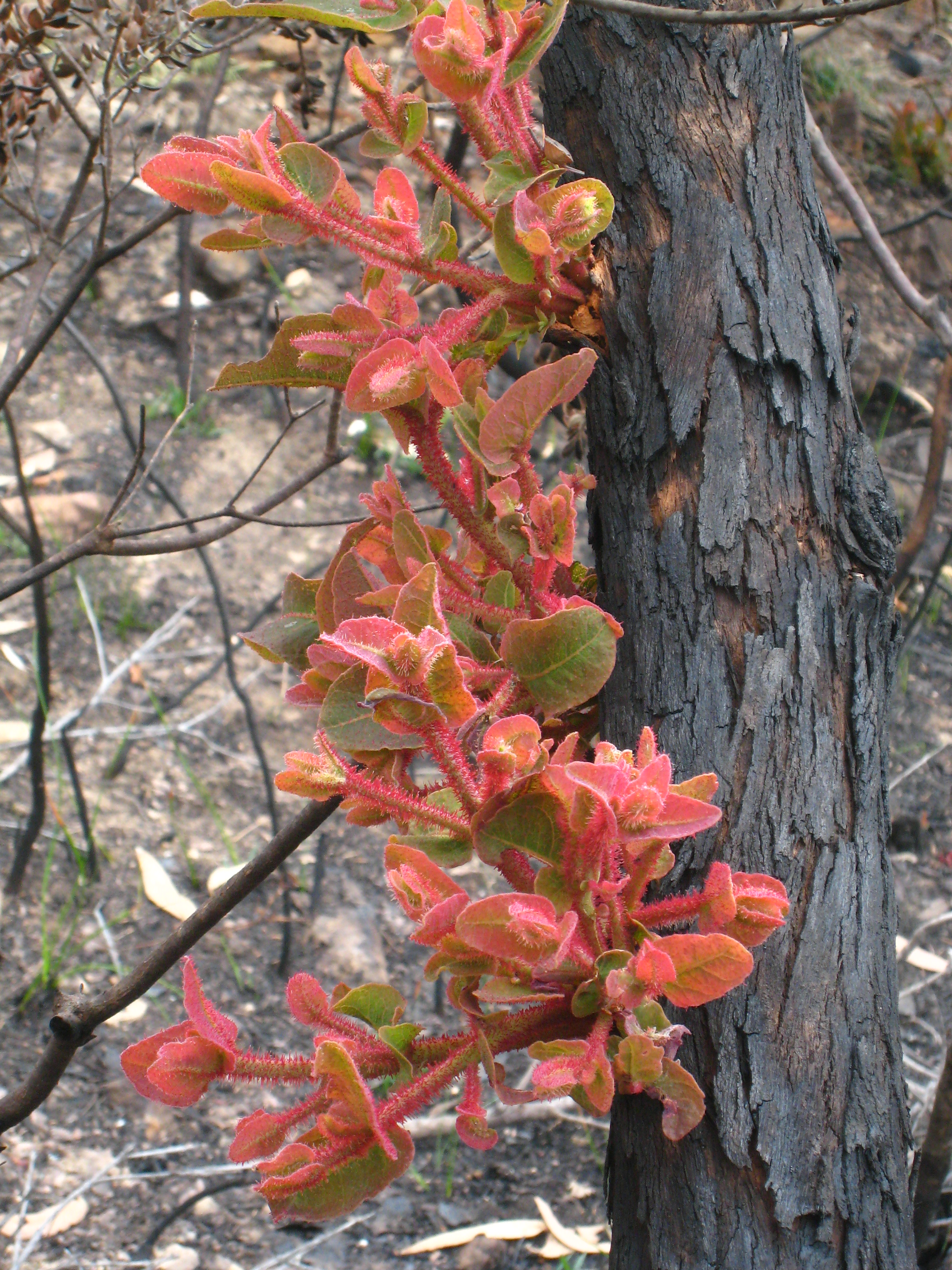
(After fire) red hairy new growth

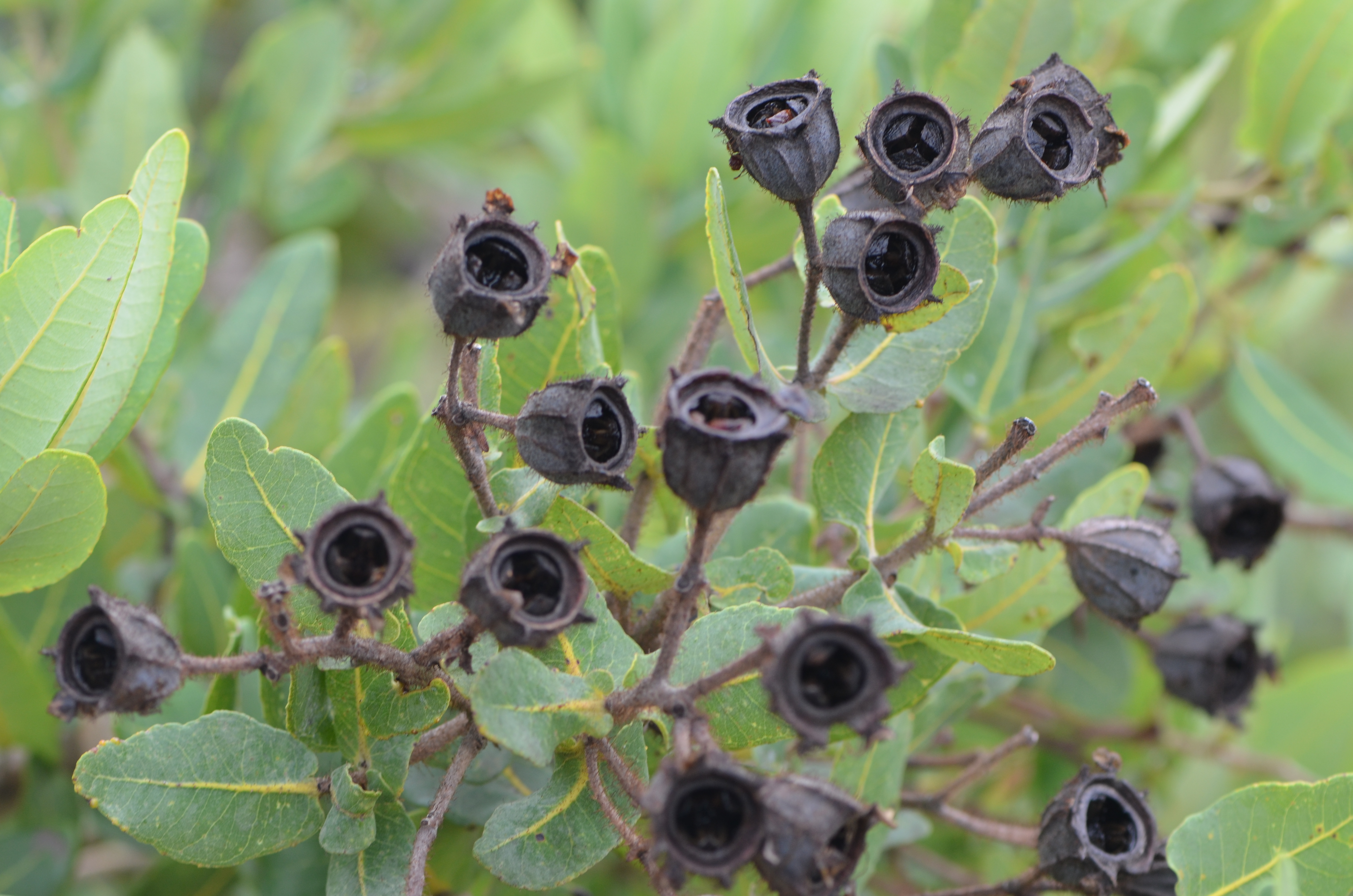
Ribbed capsules

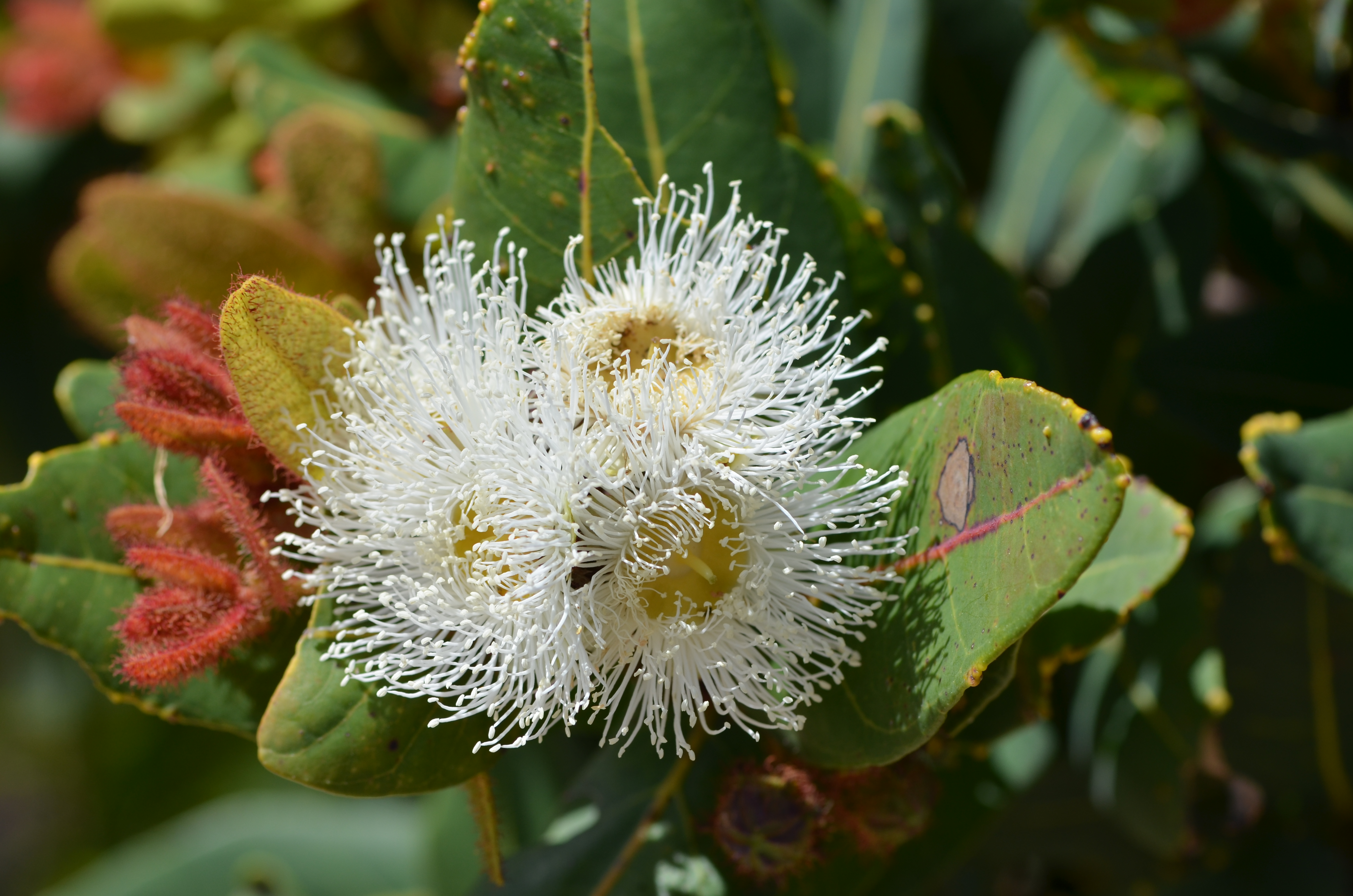
Flowers & new leaves

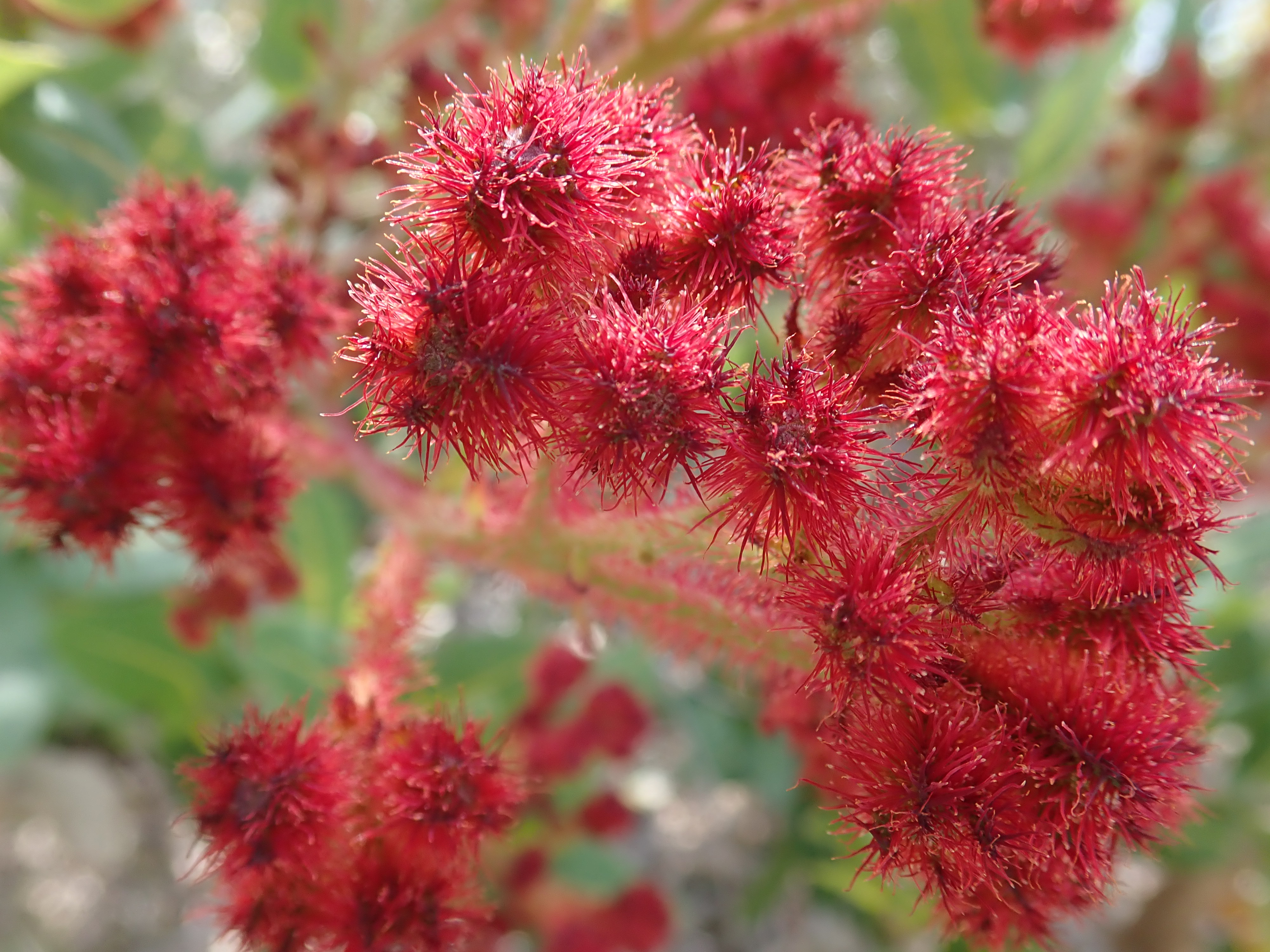
Red, hairy flower buds
