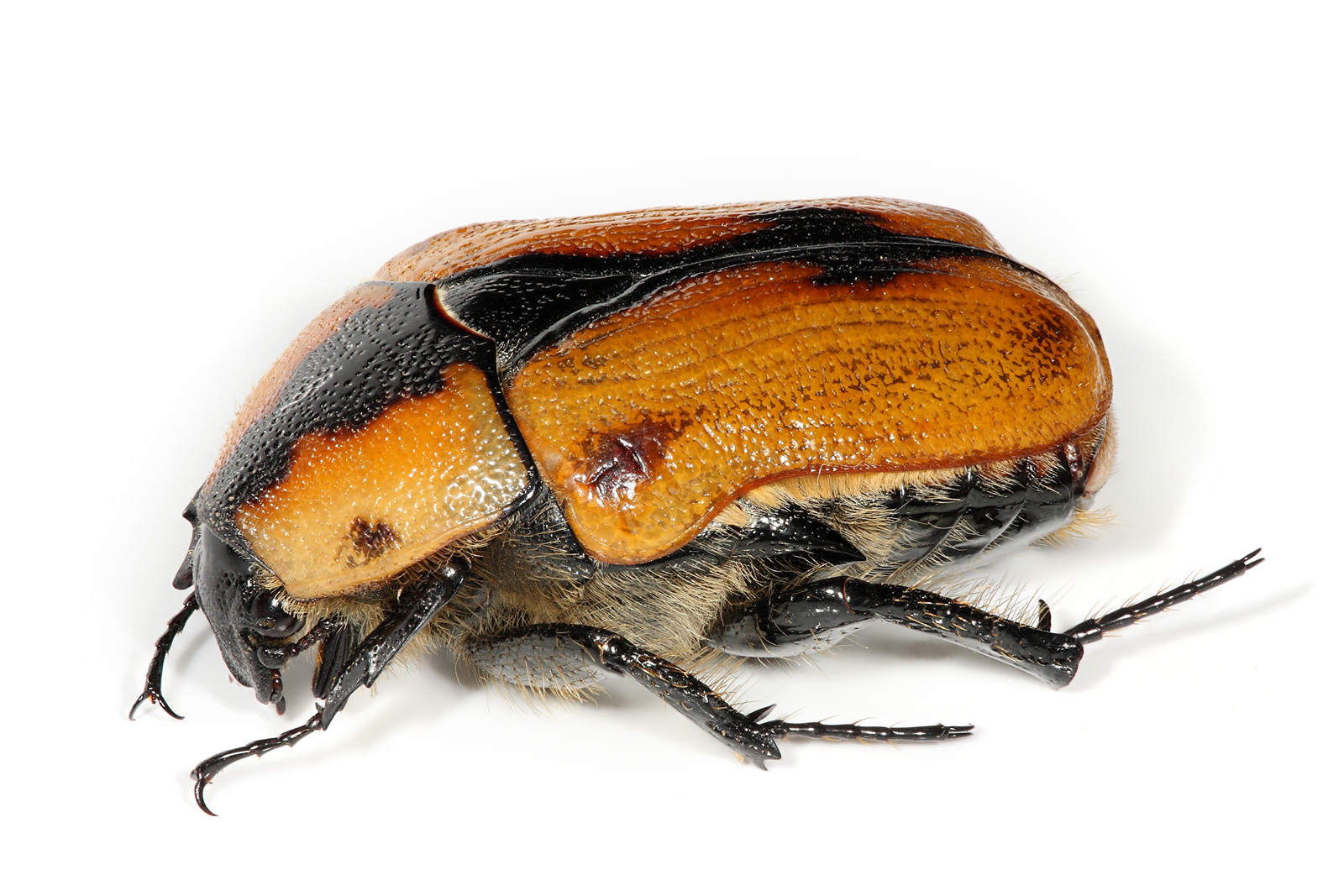
- Chondropyga dorsalis
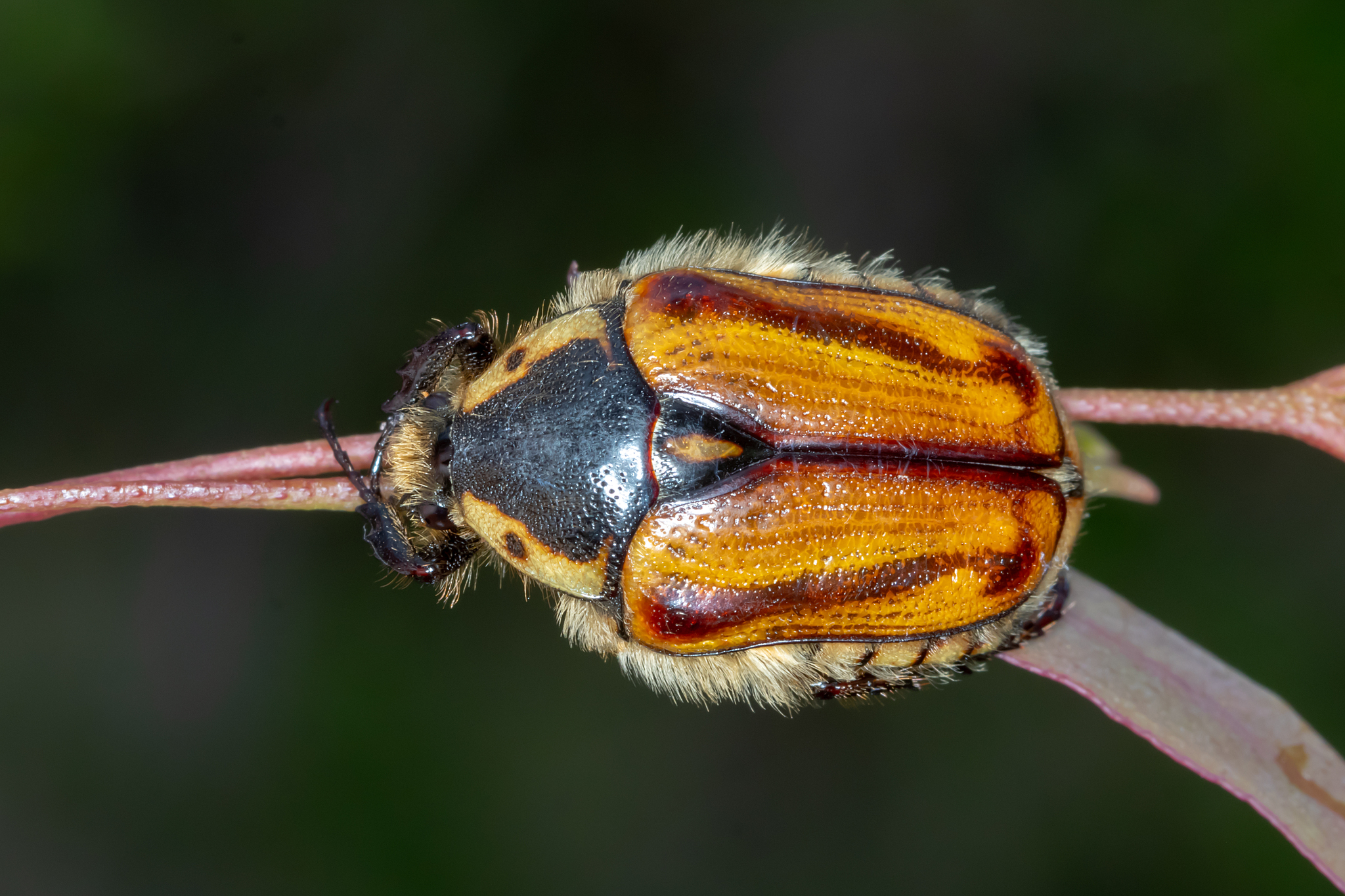
- Chondropyga gulosa from the Victoria, Australia

Scientific classification
- Kingdom: Animalia
- Phylum: Arthropoda
- Class: Insecta
- Order: Coleoptera
- Suborder: Polyphaga
- Infraorder: Scarabaeiformia
- Family: Scarabaeidae
- Subfamily: Cetoniinae
- Genus: Chondropyga; Kraatz, 1880

= Chondropyga =

Genus of beetles

Chondropyga is a genus of scarab beetles native to eastern Australia.

== Species ==
- Chondropyga allardi Rigout, 1997
- Chondropyga dorsalis (Donovan, 1805)
- Chondropyga frenchi Schoch, 1898
- Chondropyga gulosa (Janson, 1873)
- Chondropyga insignicosta Janson Hutchinson & Mossender 2013
- Chondropyga olliffiana Janson, 1889
- Chondropyga suturata Nonfried, 1891
