= Temognatha aestimata =

Scientific classification
- Kingdom: Animalia
- Phylum: Arthropoda
- Clade: Pancrustacea
- Class: Insecta
- Order: Coleoptera
- Suborder: Polyphaga
- Infraorder: Elateriformia
- Family: Buprestidae
- Genus: Temognatha
- Species: T. aestimata

Binomial name
- Temognatha aestimata (Kerremans, 1898)

Synonyms
- Stigmodera aestimata Kerremans, 1898

Species of beetle

Temognatha aestimata is a jewel beetle in the family Buprestidae, found in Victoria. It was first described in 1898 by Charles Kerremans as Stigmodera aestimata.

The adults are diurnal, and eat flowers. The larvae are wood-borers.

== See also ==
- Woodboring beetle
