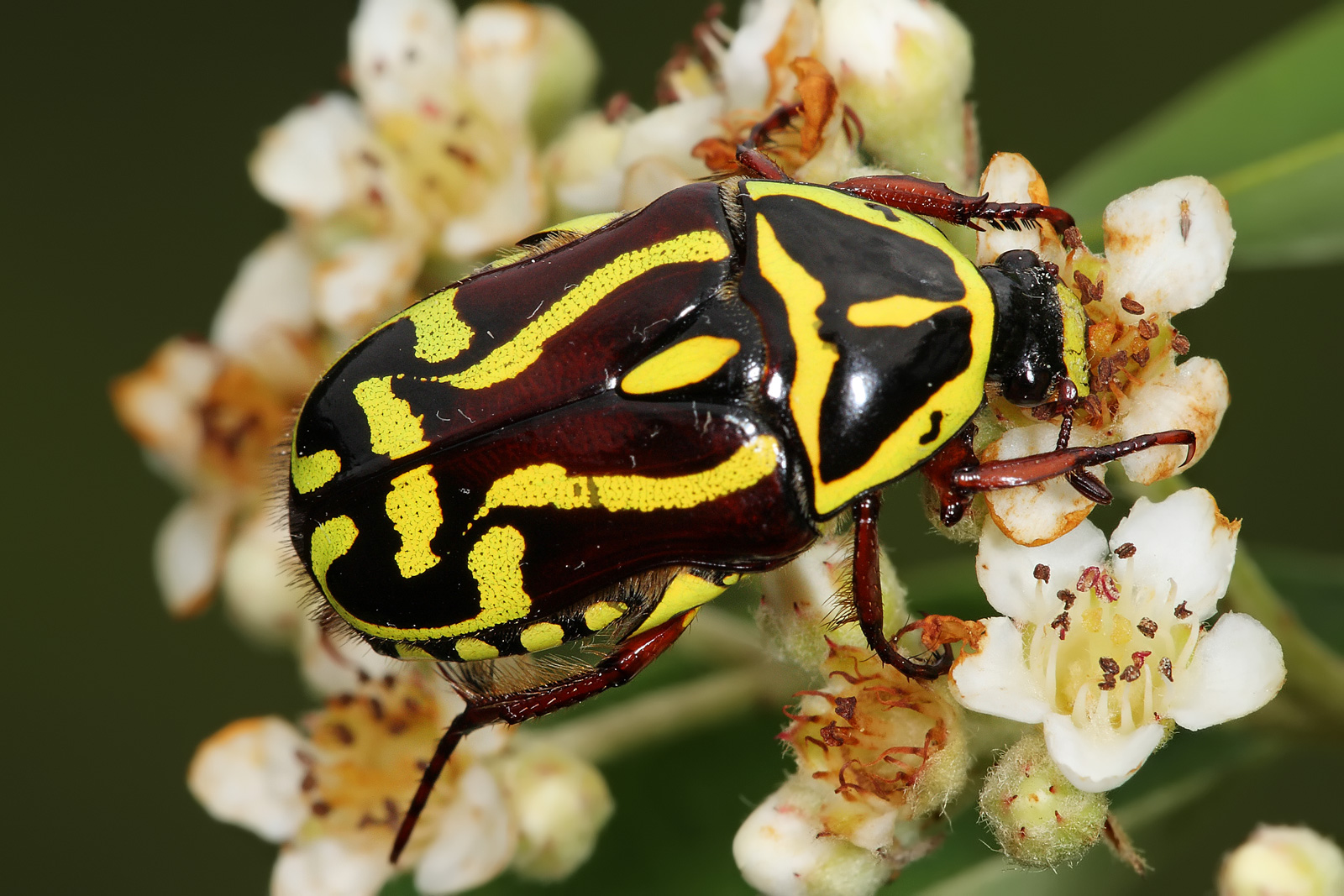
- E. australasiae

Scientific classification
- Kingdom: Animalia
- Phylum: Arthropoda
- Class: Insecta
- Order: Coleoptera
- Suborder: Polyphaga
- Infraorder: Scarabaeiformia
- Family: Scarabaeidae
- Subfamily: Cetoniinae
- Tribe: Schizorhinini
- Genus: Eupoecila; Burmeister, 1842

Species
- Eupoecila intricata Lea, 1914; Eupoecila evanescens Lea, 1914; Eupoecila inscripta Jason, 1873; Eupoecila australasiae (Donovan, 1805); Eupoecila miskini Janson, 1876; Eupoecila gracilis Schürhoff, 1934 (disputed)

= Eupoecila =

Genus of beetles

Eupoecila is a genus of scarab beetle family that includes five species, all of which are found in Australia.
