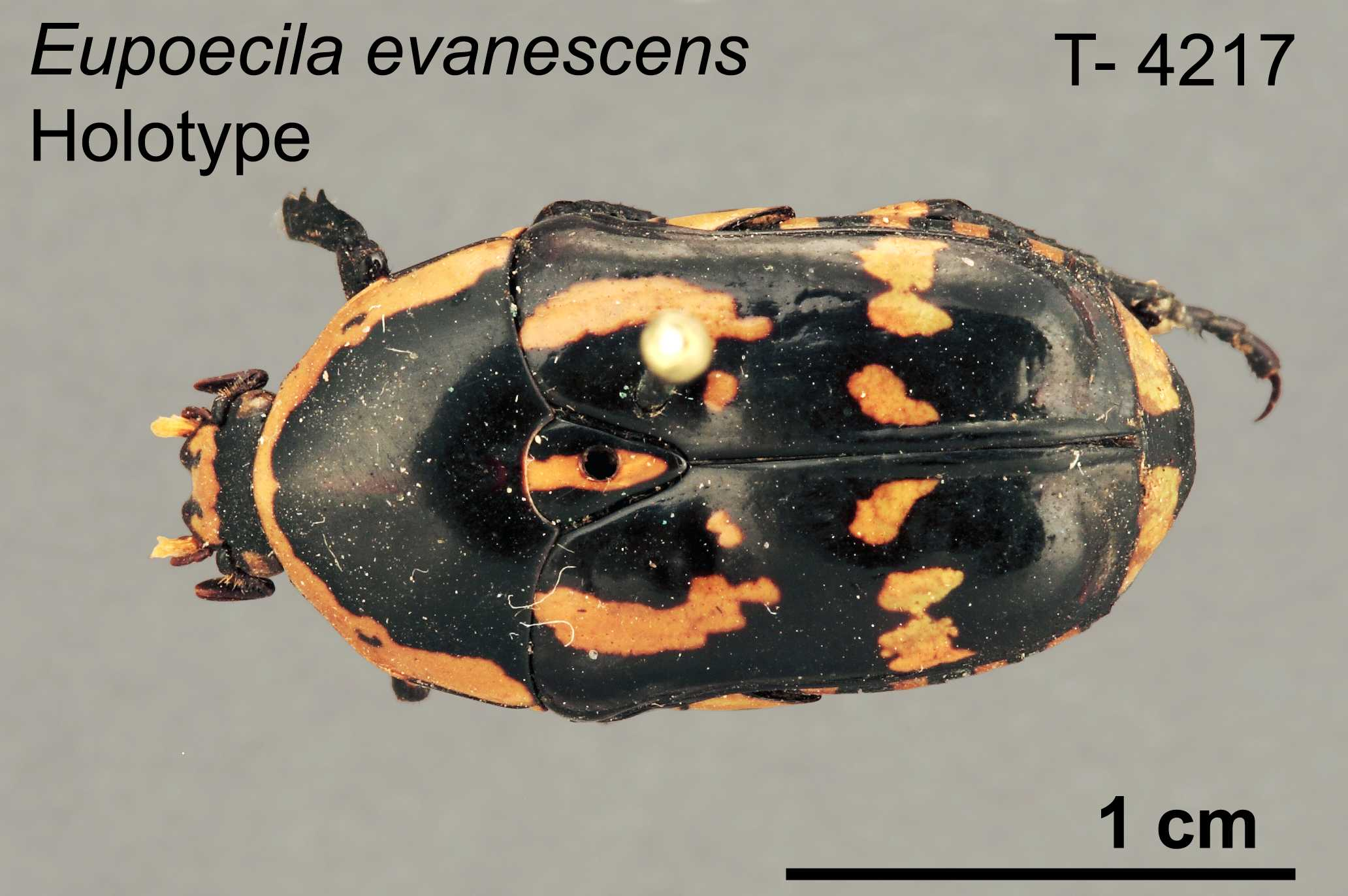
- E. evanescens ♂ dorsal view. Holotype.
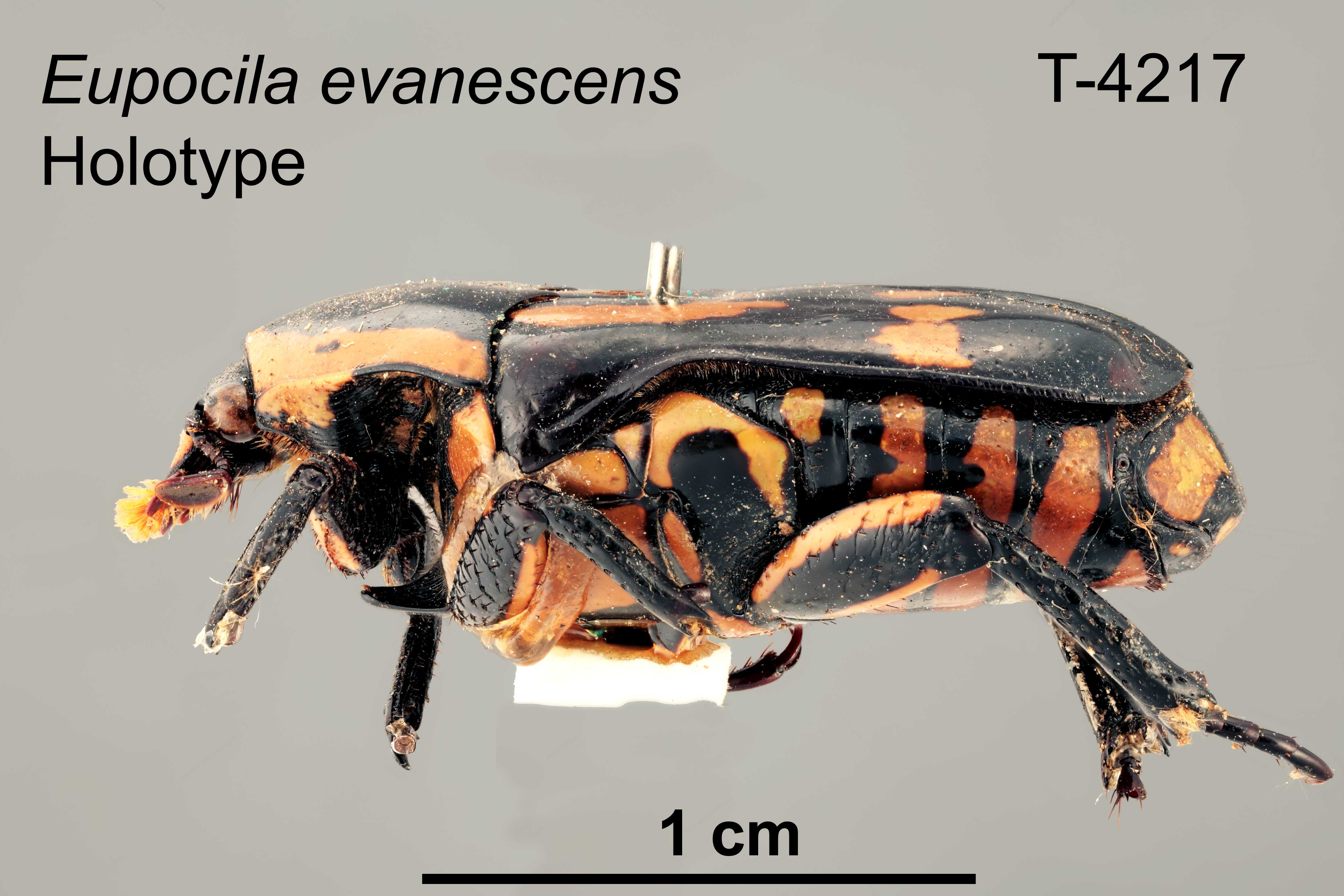
- E. evanescens ♂ lateral view. Holotype.

Scientific classification
- Domain: Eukaryota
- Kingdom: Animalia
- Phylum: Arthropoda
- Class: Insecta
- Order: Coleoptera
- Suborder: Polyphaga
- Infraorder: Scarabaeiformia
- Family: Scarabaeidae
- Subfamily: Cetoniinae
- Tribe: Schizorhinini
- Genus: Eupoecila
- Species: E. evanescens

Binomial name
- Eupoecila evanescens Lea, 1914

= Eupoecila evanescens =

Species of beetle

Eupoecila evanescens, commonly known as the orange spot beetle is a member of the scarab beetle family from north-eastern Australia, belonging to genus Eupoecila.

== Characteristics ==
The body of the beetle is black with numerous irregular orange spots, giving the species its characteristic name of orange spot beetle. Male orange spot beetles are slightly larger than the female orange spot beetles. Little is known about their mating behaviours. The abdomen of a mature beetle is 1 cm long.

== Habitat ==
Orange spot beetles are mostly confined to two remote regions of north-eastern Australia.
