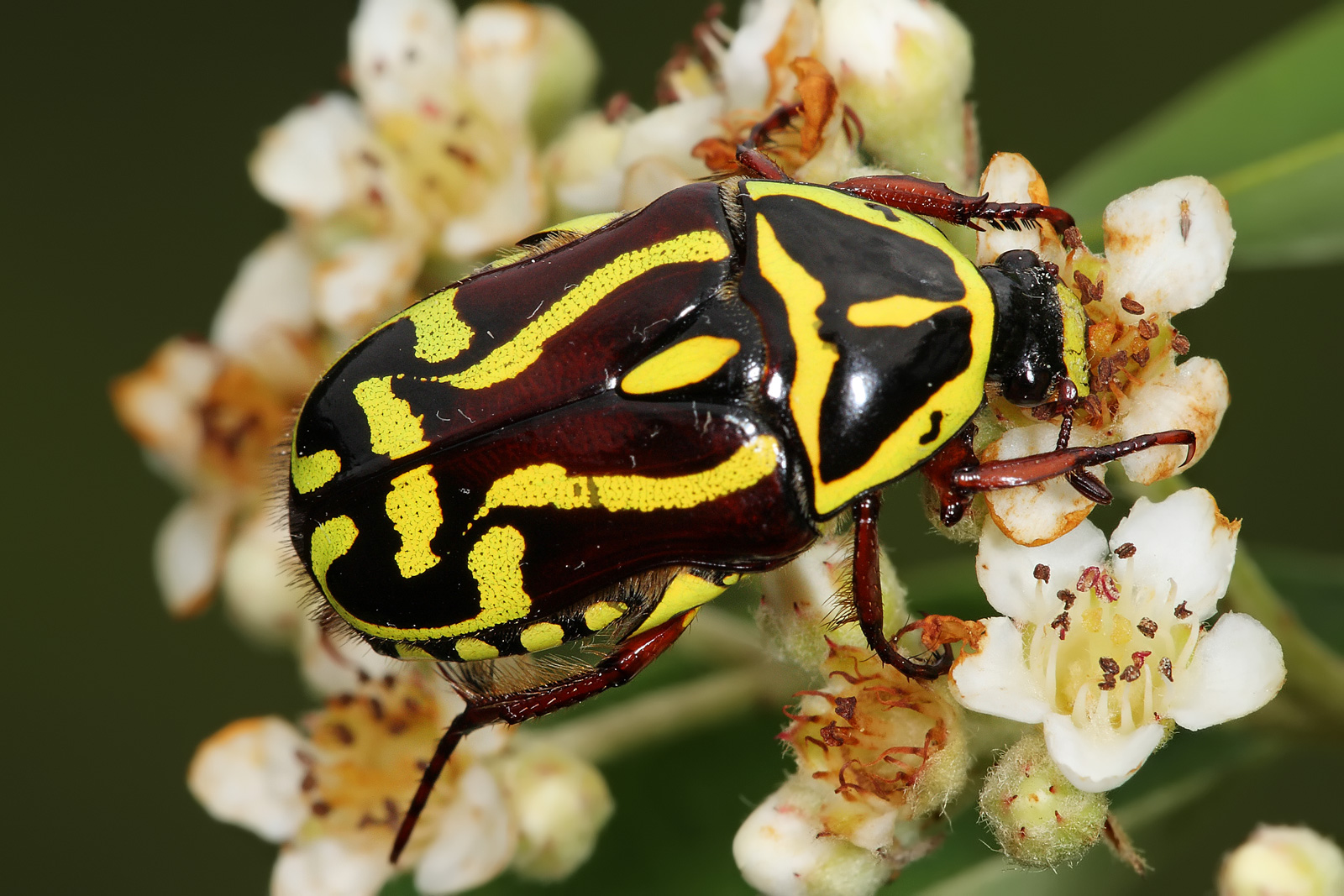

Scientific classification
- Domain: Eukaryota
- Kingdom: Animalia
- Phylum: Arthropoda
- Class: Insecta
- Order: Coleoptera
- Suborder: Polyphaga
- Infraorder: Scarabaeiformia
- Family: Scarabaeidae
- Subfamily: Cetoniinae
- Tribe: Schizorhinini
- Genus: Eupoecila
- Species: E. australasiae

Binomial name
- Eupoecila australasiae (Donovan, 1805)

= Eupoecila australasiae =

Species of beetle

Eupoecila australasiae, commonly known as the fiddler beetle or rose chafer, is a colourful green- or yellow-and-black member of the scarab beetle family from eastern Australia.

The fiddler beetle was originally described by Anglo Irish naturalist Edward Donovan as Cetonia australasiae in his 1805 work An Epitome of the Natural History of the Insects of New Holland, New Zealand, New Guinea, Otaheite, and other Islands in the Indian, Southern, and Pacific Oceans. It was reclassified in and became the type species of the new genus Eupoecila by German entomologist Hermann Burmeister in 1842. Within the scarab family, it is a member of the subfamily Cetoniinae, commonly known as flower chafers. These beetles are strong flyers and can fly without moving the elytra; they spend much of the time searching for nectar and plant exudates.

Its common name is derived from its patterned body, reminiscent of a violin.

The fiddler beetle measures 15–20 millimetres (0.6–0.8 in) in length, its body patterned dark brown and lime green to yellow.

It is found in eastern Australia, in Queensland, New South Wales, Victoria, and southeastern South Australia, and lives in heathland and eucalypt woodland, as well as suburban parks and gardens.

Eggs are laid in rotting logs, or in debris or soil. The larvae eat rotting wood until they mature and pupate there by making a cocoon-like chamber within the wood. Adult beetles burrow through the soil and emerge in early summer, and feed on nectar-laden flowers. These include Angophora hispida and A. woodsiana, Backhousia citriodora, and Melaleuca linariifolia.
