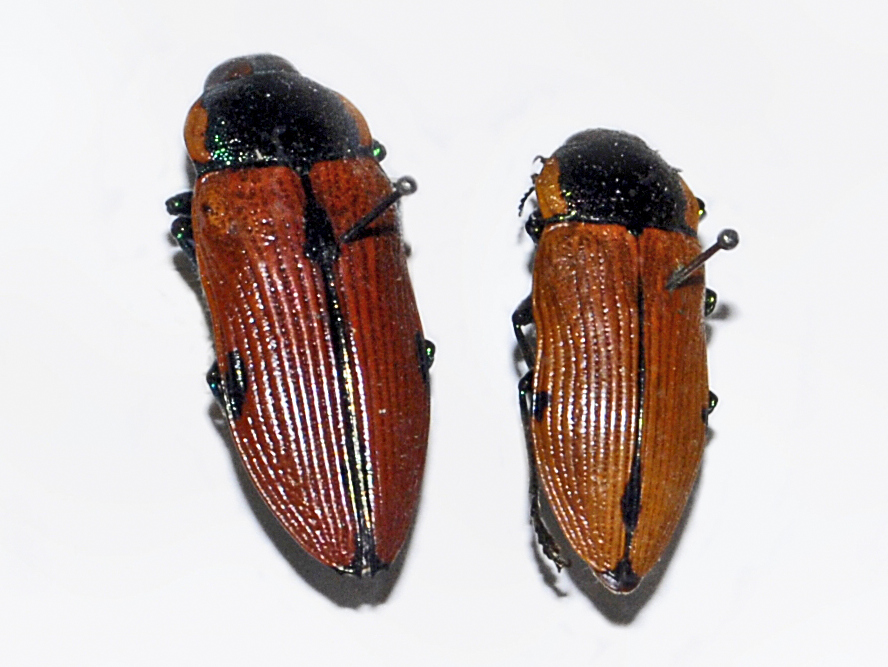
- Mounted specimen
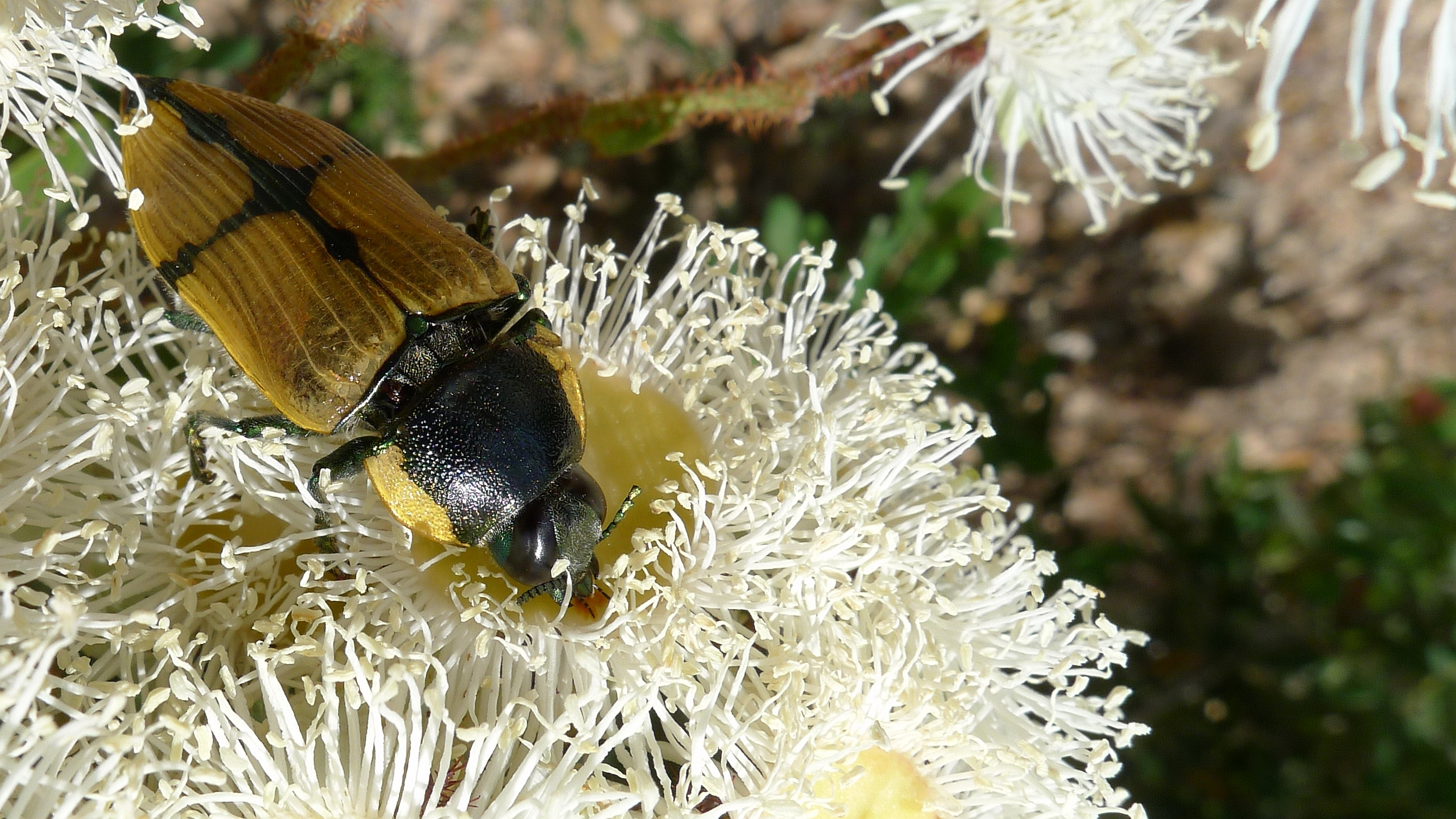
- A live individual

Scientific classification
- Kingdom: Animalia
- Phylum: Arthropoda
- Clade: Pancrustacea
- Class: Insecta
- Order: Coleoptera
- Suborder: Polyphaga
- Infraorder: Elateriformia
- Family: Buprestidae
- Genus: Temognatha
- Species: T. variabilis

Binomial name
- Temognatha variabilis (Donovan, 1805)

Synonyms
- Stigmodera variabilis Donovan, 1805; Buprestis kingi Macleay, 1827; Stigmodera nigripennis Gory and Laporte, 1838; Stigmodera quinquefossulata Théry, 1911; Stigmodera unifasciata Gory and Laporte, 1838; Stigmodera cyaniventris Kerremans, 1900; Buprestis variabilis Donovan, 1805

= Temognatha variabilis =

Species of beetle

Temognatha variabilis, commonly known as the variable jewel beetle, is a beetle of the family Buprestidae.

== Description ==
Temognatha variabilis can reach a length of about 35 millimetres (1.4 in). The body colour is highly variable, ranging from yellowish to dark red. Helytra are punctato-striate and may have black markings. The thorax usually show a median black area with yellow or bright red markings on each side. Head and legs are black with greenish reflections.

Larvae live in she-oak tree of Casuarina species (Casuarinaceae).

== Distribution ==
This species can be found in southeastern Australia.

== See also ==
- Woodboring beetle

== Bibliography ==
- Insects of Australia and New Zealand - R. J. Tillyard, Angus & Robertson, Ltd, Sydney, 1926, p217 (Stigmodera variabilis ).
- Insects of Australia, George Hangay & Pavel German, Reed New Holland, 2000, p72.
- Peterson, Magnus., 1996: Aspects of female reproductive biology of two southwestern Australian Temognatha species Coleoptera Buprestidae. Records of the Western Australian Museum, 182: 203-208
