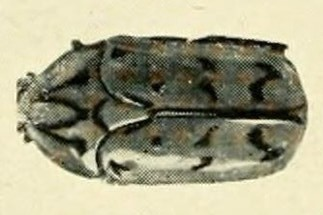

Scientific classification
- Domain: Eukaryota
- Kingdom: Animalia
- Phylum: Arthropoda
- Class: Insecta
- Order: Coleoptera
- Suborder: Polyphaga
- Infraorder: Scarabaeiformia
- Family: Scarabaeidae
- Subfamily: Cetoniinae
- Tribe: Schizorhinini
- Genus: Eupoecila
- Species: E. inscripta

Binomial name
- Eupoecila inscripta (Janson, 1873)

= Eupoecila inscripta =

Species of beetle

Eupoecila inscripta is a species of scarab beetle in the genus Eupoecila, found in western Australia.

== Description ==
This species of beetle is green with black features. It usually feeds on nectar obtained from flowers, playing its role in pollination. Male and female beetles are usually similar in size. It is widespread in western half of Australia.
