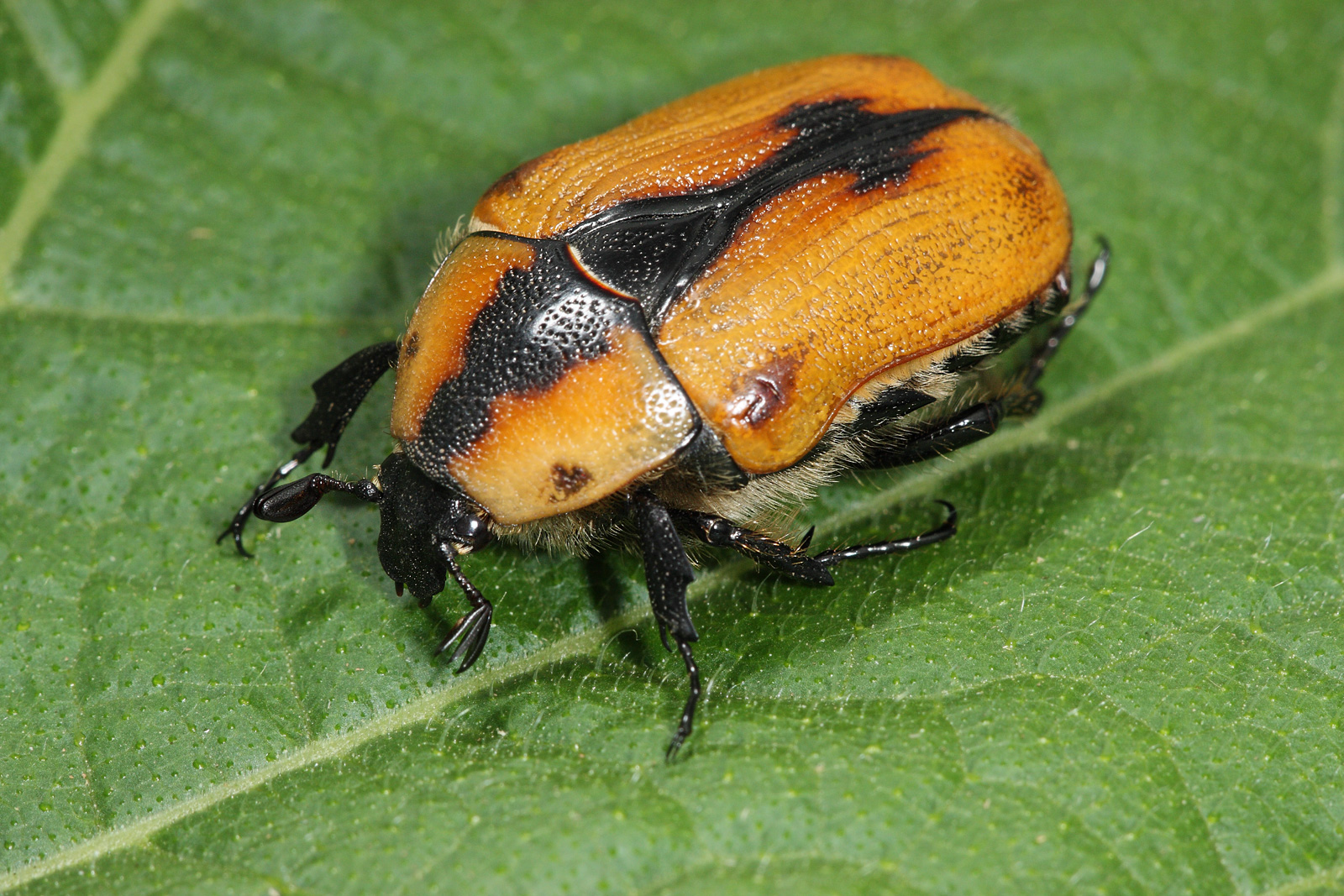

Scientific classification
- Kingdom: Animalia
- Phylum: Arthropoda
- Clade: Pancrustacea
- Class: Insecta
- Order: Coleoptera
- Suborder: Polyphaga
- Infraorder: Scarabaeiformia
- Family: Scarabaeidae
- Genus: Chondropyga
- Species: C. dorsalis

Binomial name
- Chondropyga dorsalis (Donovan, 1805)

= Chondropyga dorsalis =

Species of beetle

Chondropyga dorsalis, the cowboy beetle, is a large beetle endemic to Australia.

== Description ==
The cowboy beetle grows to 20–25 mm (0.8–1 in) long with females generally slightly larger than males. It has a yellow-brown colouration. When in flight or when threatened, it produces a loud buzzing noise which mimics the sounds of a large wasp.

== Distribution and habitat ==
It is found in south eastern Australia - throughout Victoria, New South Wales and part of Queensland. Adults feed on nectar while larvae live in rotten wood. They live in woodlands, dry sclerophyll forests and residential gardens.

== Life cycle ==
Eggs are laid in damp locations in or around rotting logs. Once hatched, the larvae feed on the rotting timber until ready to pupate. They construct their pupae from mud and rotting debris. Adults emerge in summer. Adults feed on nectar-bearing shrubs and trees.
