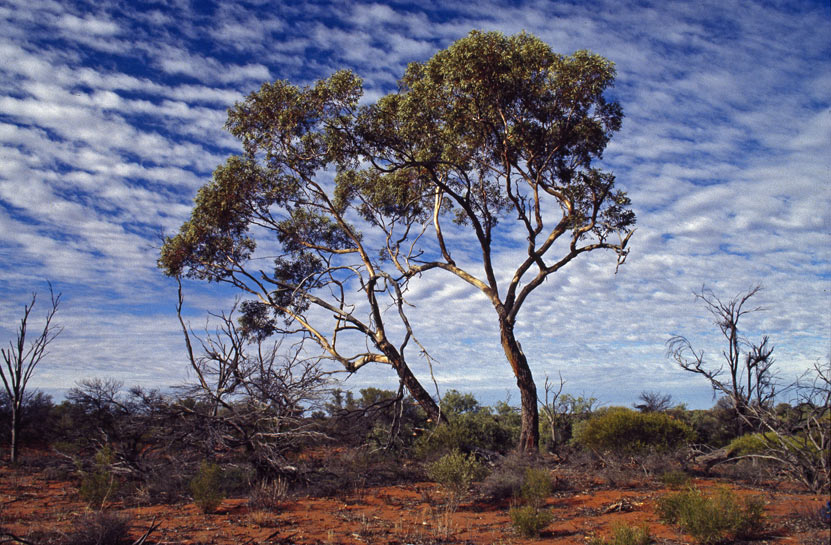
- Subspecies victoriensis near Cook in the Great Victoria Desert

Scientific classification
- Kingdom: Plantae
- Clade: Embryophytes
- Clade: Tracheophytes
- Clade: Spermatophytes
- Clade: Angiosperms
- Clade: Eudicots
- Clade: Rosids
- Order: Myrtales
- Family: Myrtaceae
- Genus: Eucalyptus
- Species: E. socialis
- Subspecies: E. s. subsp. victoriensis

Trinomial name
- Eucalyptus socialis subsp. victoriensis D.Nicolle

= Eucalyptus socialis subsp. victoriensis =

Red mallee

Subspecies of eucalyptus

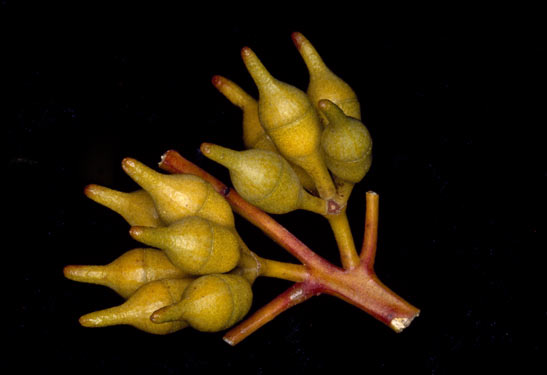
Flower buds

Eucalyptus socialis subsp. victoriensis, commonly known as the red mallee, is a subspecies of mallee that is endemic to southern inland Australia. It usually has rough bark on the base of the trunk, smooth bark above, lance-shaped adult leaves, flower buds in groups of between seven and eleven, pale creamy yellow flowers and barrel-shaped to urn-shaped or spherical fruit.

== Description ==
Eucalyptus socialis subsp. victoriensis is a mallee that typically grows to a height of 3–8 m (9.8–26.2 ft) and forms a lignotuber. It usually has rough, loose, fibrous or flaky bark at the base of the trunk, smooth tan to grey bark above. Adult leaves are the same shade of dull bluish green on both sides, lance-shaped, 80–152 mm (3.1–6.0 in) long and 20–35 mm (0.79–1.38 in) wide and petiolate. The flower buds are arranged in leaf axils usually in groups of between seven and eleven, on an unbranched peduncle 4–18 mm (0.16–0.71 in) long, the individual buds on pedicels 2–8 mm (0.079–0.315 in) long. Mature buds are 12.5–19 mm (0.49–0.75 in) long and 4–6.5 mm (0.16–0.26 in) wide with a horn-shaped operculum that is longer than the floral cup. The flowers are pale creamy yellow and the fruit is a woody barrel-shaped to urn-shaped or spherical capsule 7–11 mm (0.28–0.43 in) long and 6.5–9.5 mm (0.26–0.37 in) wide.

== Taxonomy and naming ==
Eucalyptus socialis subsp. victoriensis was first formally described in 2005, by Dean Nicolle in Australian Systematic Botany from specimens collected near Neale Junction in 1999, close to the border between South Australia and Western Australia. The epithet victoriensis refers to this species' distribution in the Great Victoria Desert.

== Distribution and habitat ==
This red mallee grows in mallee on sandplains and between sand dunes, often with other eucalypts, including E. concinna, E. eremicola and E. pimpiniana. It is restricted to the Great Victoria Desert in South Australia and Western Australia.

== Conservation status ==
This mallee subspecies is classified as "not threatened" by the Western Australian Government Department of Parks and Wildlife.
