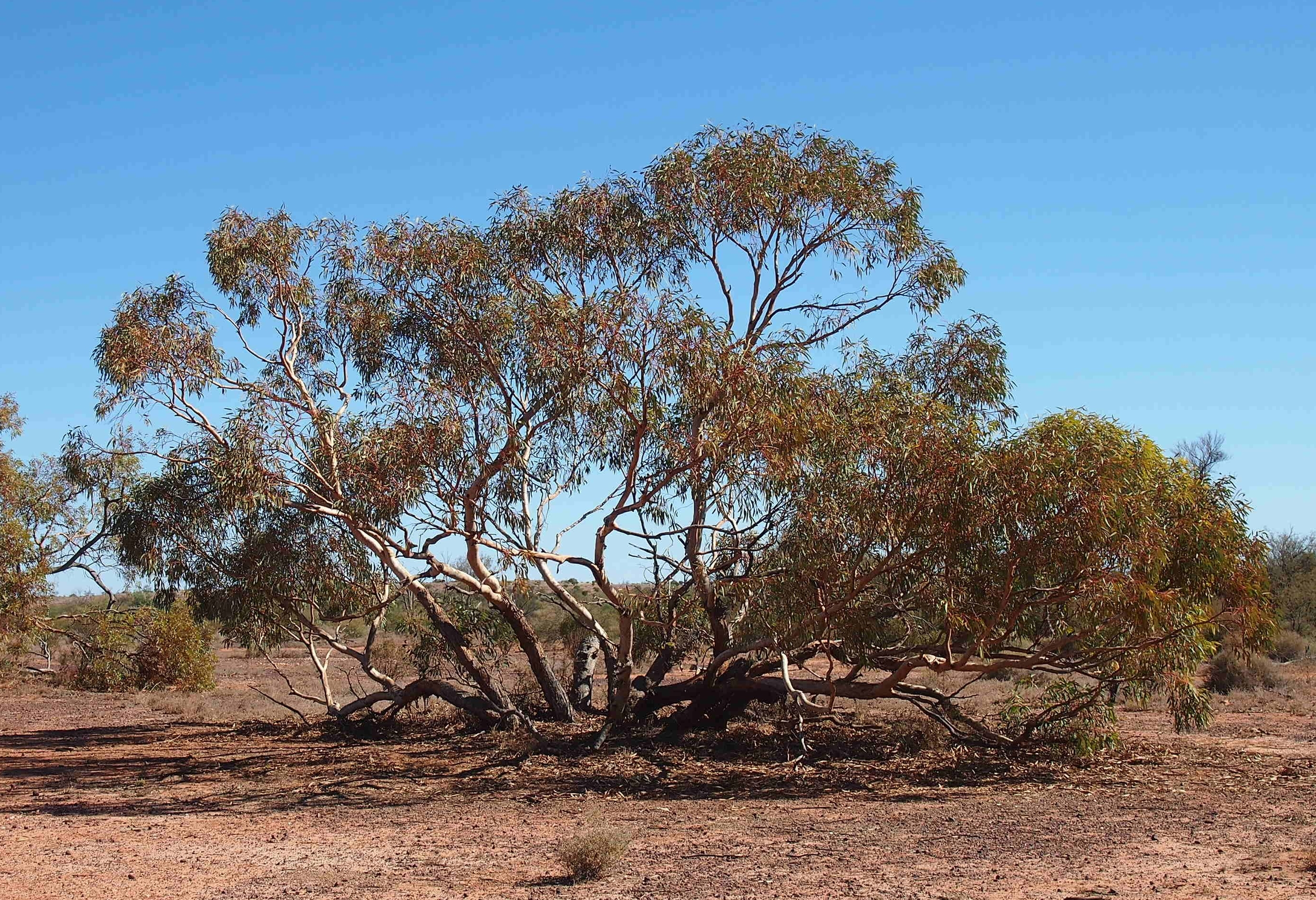
- Eucalyptus socialis

Conservation status
- Near Threatened (IUCN 3.1)

Scientific classification
- Kingdom: Plantae
- Clade: Tracheophytes
- Clade: Angiosperms
- Clade: Eudicots
- Clade: Rosids
- Order: Myrtales
- Family: Myrtaceae
- Genus: Eucalyptus
- Species: E. socialis

Binomial name
- Eucalyptus socialis F.Muell. ex Miq.

= Eucalyptus socialis =

Red mallee

Species of eucalyptus

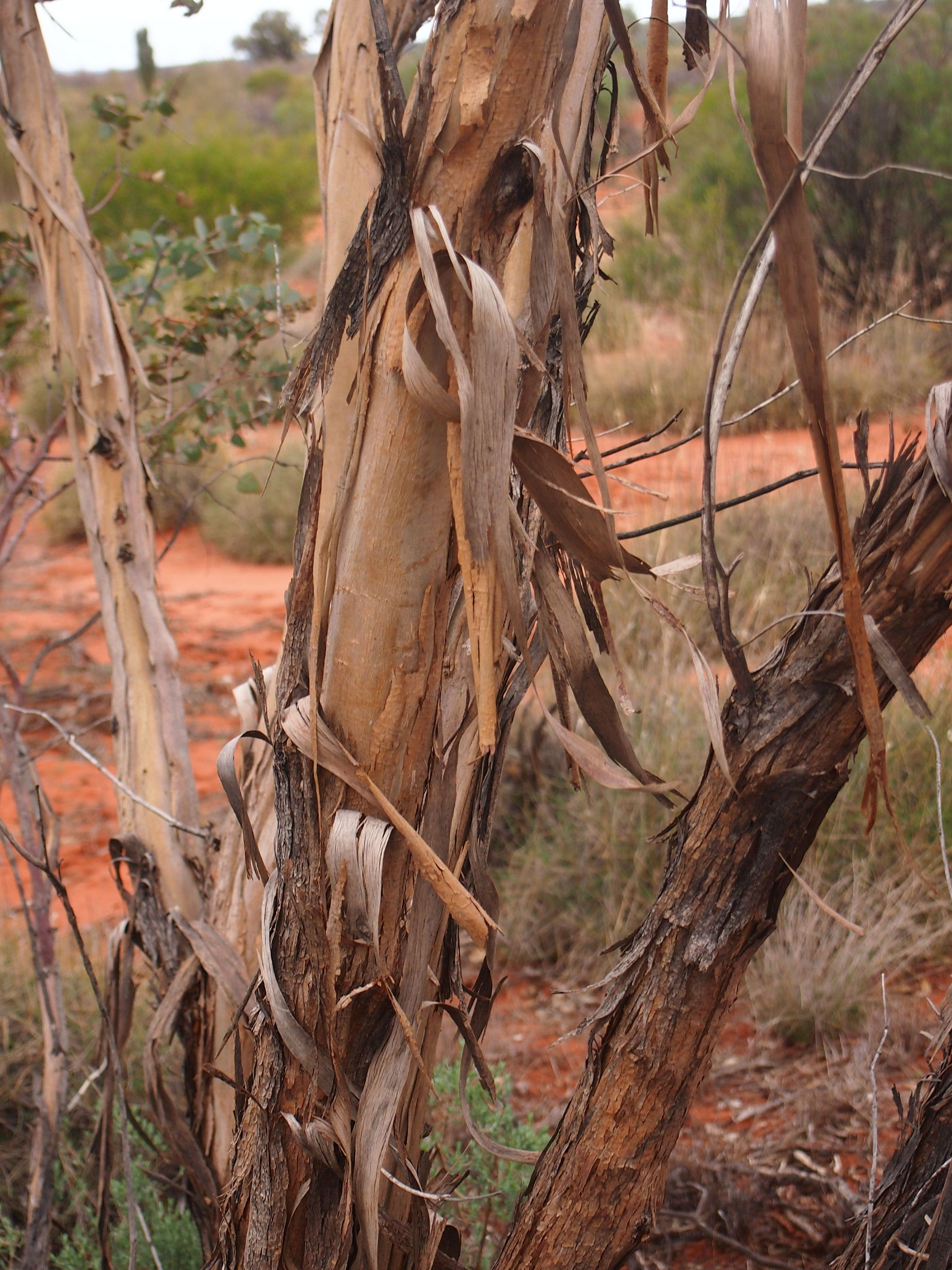
Bark

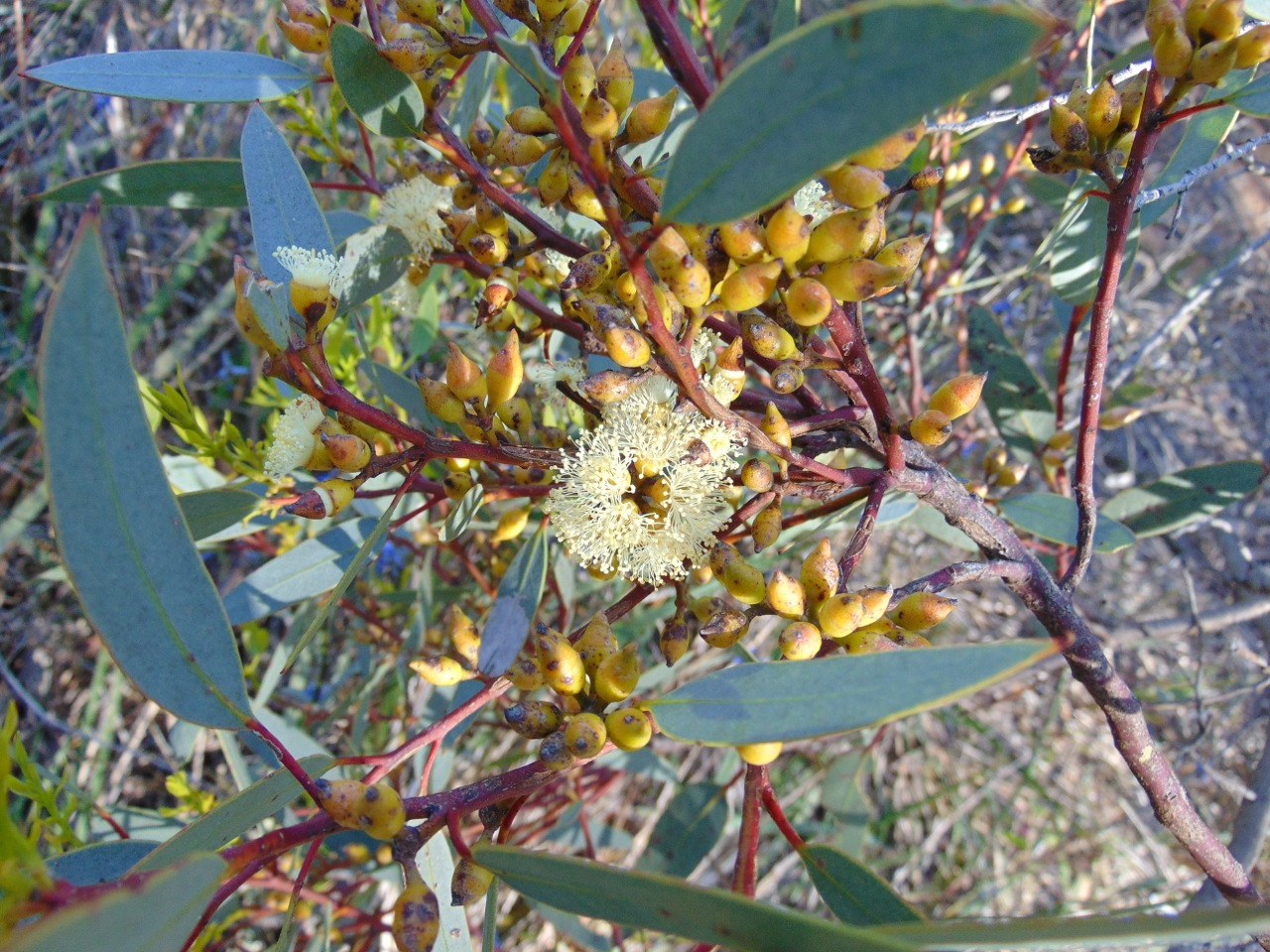
Flower buds and flowers

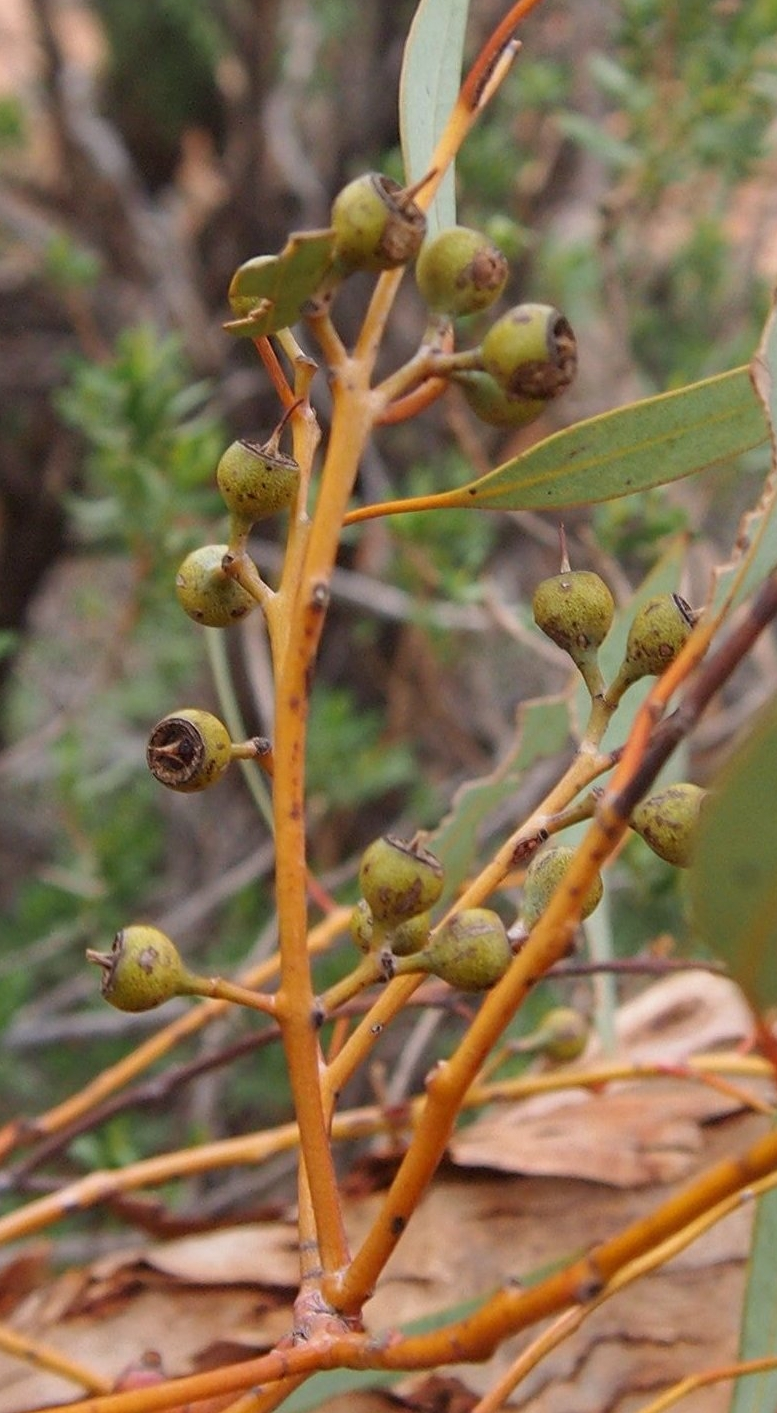
Fruit

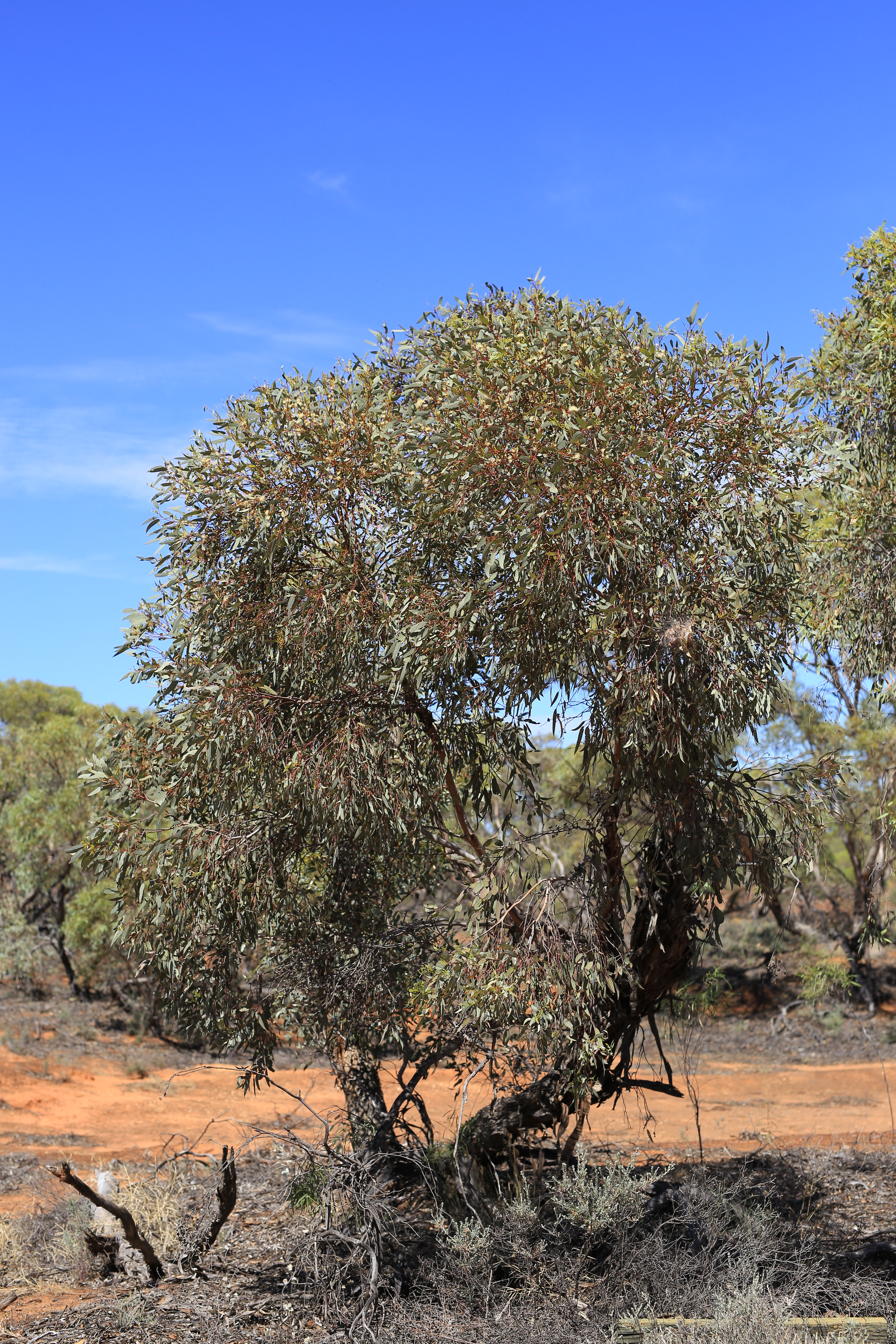
Habit in Hattah-Kulkyne National Park

Eucalyptus socialis, commonly known as the red mallee, or grey mallee, is a species of mallee that is endemic to inland Australia.

== Description ==
Eucalyptus socialis is a mallee that typically grows to a height of 5 to 7 metres (16 to 23 ft), but can reach as high as 12 metres (39 ft), and forms a lignotuber. The canopy is about 5 metres (16 ft) wide. It usually has rough, grey bark on the trunk and smooth dull grey bark that is shed in long ribbons above. Young plants and coppice regrowth have stems that are square in cross-section and leaves that are dull green to greyish, egg-shaped to lance-shaped or elliptical, 40–80 mm (1.6–3.1 in) long and 18–42 mm (0.71–1.65 in) wide. Adult leaves are arranged alternately, the same dull green or greyish colour on both sides, lance-shaped, 50–140 mm (2.0–5.5 in) long and 10–22 mm (0.39–0.87 in) wide, tapering to a petiole 10–30 mm (0.39–1.18 in) long. The flower buds are arranged in leaf axils in groups of between seven and thirteen on an unbranched peduncle 4–23 mm (0.16–0.91 in) long, the individual buds on pedicels 3–8 mm (0.12–0.31 in) long. Mature buds are oval to spindle-shaped, 8–17 mm (0.31–0.67 in) long and 3–5 mm (0.12–0.20 in) wide with a conical, beaked or horn-shaped operculum 5–12 mm (0.20–0.47 in) long. Flowering occurs in most months and the flowers are white to pale yellow. The fruit is a woody urn-shaped to shortened spherical capsule 4–9 mm (0.16–0.35 in) long and 4–8 mm (0.16–0.31 in) wide with the valves enclosed but with the remains of the style protruding but fragile.

== Taxonomy ==
Eucalyptus socialis was first formally described by Friedrich Anton Wilhelm Miquel in 1856 in the journal Nederlandsch Kruidkundig Archief, from an unpublished description by Ferdinand von Mueller.

The species name socialis a Latin word meaning "friendly", alluding to this species being associated with other eucalypt species as part of mallee communities.

In 2005, Dean Nicolle described four subspecies of E. socialis and the names are accepted by the Australian Plant Census as at December 2019:

- Eucalyptus socialis subsp. eucentrica (L.A.S.Johnson & K.D.Hill) D.Nicolle is distinguished from the other subspecies by the waxy coating on its branchlets and flower buds and by the dull bluish colour of its adult leaves;
- Eucalyptus socialis F.Muell. ex Miq. subsp. socialis has smaller leaves, buds and fruit than the other subspecies and creamy white flowers;
- Eucalyptus socialis subsp. victoriensis D.Nicolle has larger leaves, flower buds and fruit than the other subspecies and cream to pale yellow flowers;
- Eucalyptus socialis subsp. viridans D.Nicolle is mainly distinguished by its green, rather than bluish green leaves.

E. socialis and E. gillii have undergone extensive hybridisation in parts of the Barrier Range of New South Wales.

== Distribution ==
It is one of the most widespread mallee species in Australia. In Western Australia it is found on calcareous flats and rocky scree slopes in the Pilbara and Goldfields-Esperance regions where it grows in red-grey loam over limestone. It is also found through much of South Australia, particularly in southern areas such as the Eyre Peninsula, Gawler Range, Flinders Ranges and Adelaide foothills where it is common. The range extends into the southern part of the Northern Territory, where it is found in the Alice Springs region and into parts of Queensland where it is found in open woodlands, where it often occurs with E. dumosa, E. gracilis and E. leptophylla. In New South Wales it is found west from Condoblin with a sporadic distribution from Wilcannia. In these areas it is found in mallee shrubland communities on red aeolian sands. In Victoria it is found in the north west of the state.

== Ecology ==
Following bushfires the species can resprout basally and has a mortality rate of less than 30% when 100% of leaves are scorched.

== Uses ==
E. socialis is suitable to produce large amounts of biomass, able to make 10 to 20 metric tons (11 to 22 short tons) per hectare per year. In wheatbelt regions it is also beneficial as the tree will reduce salinity, give shade to stock, act as a windbreak and reduce erosion.

=== Traditional uses ===
Indigenous Australians used the tree for making bowls and medicines from the leaves, shields and spears from the bark and obtained water from roots.

=== Use in horticulture ===
The plant is sold commercially and is noted for its ability to grow in poor soils. It is very attractive to bees and butterflies who use the nectar for food from spring to summer during flowering. It is drought- and salt-tolerant and will grow in full sun in well-drained soils. It is slow-growing but used in revegetation projects and as a small garden tree.

== See also ==
- List of Eucalyptus species
