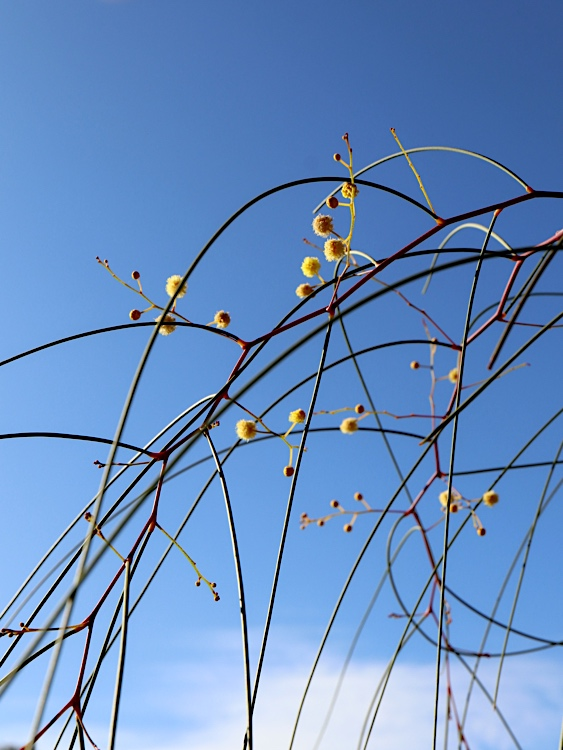
- In the ANBG

Conservation status
- Vulnerable (EPBC Act)

Scientific classification
- Kingdom: Plantae
- Clade: Tracheophytes
- Clade: Angiosperms
- Clade: Eudicots
- Clade: Rosids
- Order: Fabales
- Family: Fabaceae
- Subfamily: Caesalpinioideae
- Clade: Mimosoid clade
- Genus: Acacia
- Species: A. araneosa

Binomial name
- Acacia araneosa Whibley
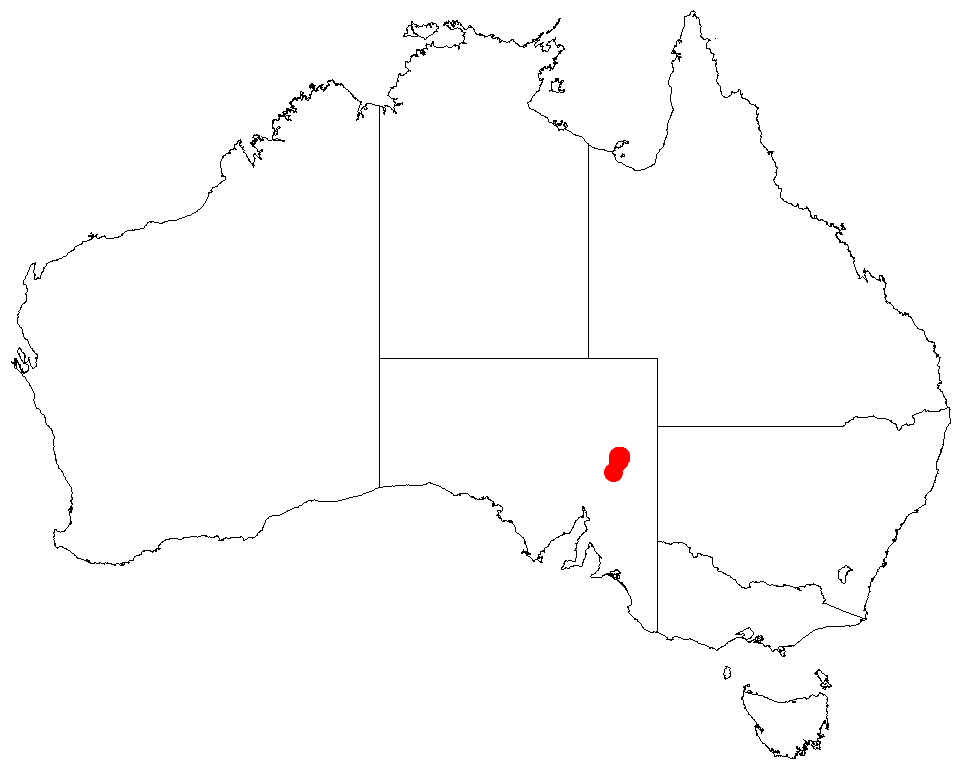

Synonyms
- Racosperma araneosum (Whibley) Pedley

= Acacia araneosa =

Balcanoona Wattle

Species of plant

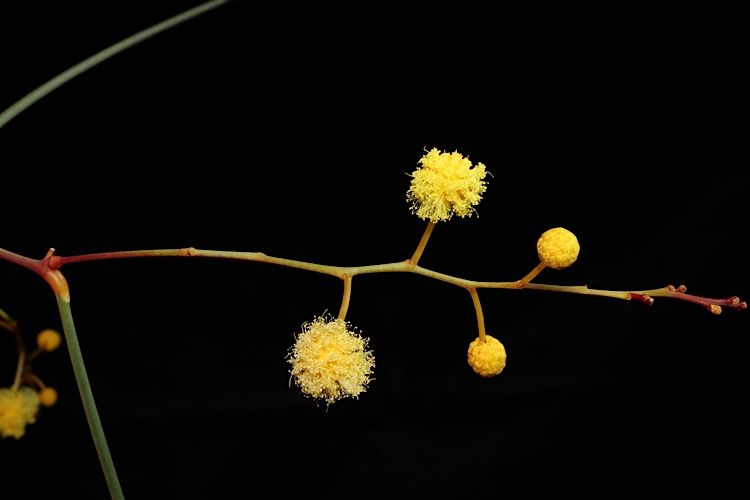
Heads of flowers

Acacia araneosa, commonly known as Balcanoona wattle or spidery wattle, is a species of flowering plant in the family Fabaceae and is endemic to South Australia. It is a small, wispy tree with pendulous phyllodes that are circular in cross section, racemes of spherical heads of yellow flowers, and linear pods up to 145 mm (5.7 in) long.

== Description ==
Acacia araneosa is a small, erect, wispy tree that typically grows to a height of 3–8 m (9.8–26.2 ft) with a slender trunk 4–7 cm (1.6–2.8 in) in diameter. The bark is smooth and grey, reddish brown on branchlets. The phyllodes are pendulous, circular in cross section, mostly 180–350 mm (7.1–13.8 in) long and 1.0–1.8 mm (0.039–0.071 in) in diameter. The flowers are arranged in spherical heads in racemes 35–95 mm (1.4–3.7 in) long in leaf axils, on peduncles mostly 7–10 mm (0.28–0.39 in) long. The heads are compact, composed of 50 to 65 yellow flowers, with stamens 2.8–3.5 mm (0.11–0.14 in) long. Flowering has been observed from May to October, and the fruit is a crusty, linear pod 60–145 mm (2.4–5.7 in) long and 4–6 mm (0.16–0.24 in) wide, containing hard, black, oval seeds up to 5 mm (0.20 in) long and 3 mm (0.12 in) wide with an orange aril.

== Taxonomy ==
Acacia araneosa was first formally described by the botanist David Whibley in Contributions from the Herbarium Australiense, from specimens collected near Nudlamutana Well in the northern Flinders Ranges. The specific epithet (araneosa) means 'cobwebby', referring to the appearance of the plant.

== Distribution and habitat ==
Balcanoona wattle has a limited distribution in association with Eucalyptus gillii and Triodia irritans in the Vulkathunha-Gammon Ranges National Park, from Balcanoona to Arkaroola, where it is found on rocky slopes, ridges and hills in open woodland, in skeletal soils.

== Conservation status ==
Balcanoona wattle is listed as "vulnerable" under the Australian Government Environment Protection and Biodiversity Conservation Act 1999 and as "endangered" under the National Parks and Wildlife Act 1972. The main threats to the species are habitat degradation, and browsing by feral rabbits (Oryctolagus cuniculus) and feral goats (Capra hircus).

== See also ==
- List of Acacia species
