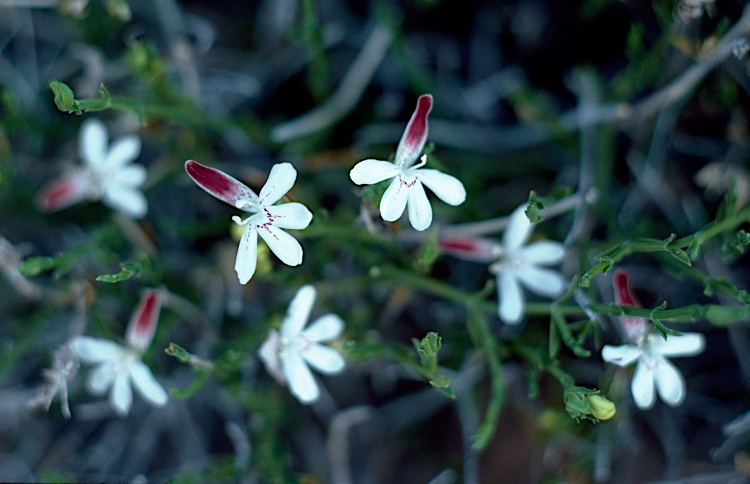

Conservation status
- Vulnerable (EPBC Act)

Scientific classification
- Kingdom: Plantae
- Clade: Tracheophytes
- Clade: Angiosperms
- Clade: Eudicots
- Clade: Asterids
- Order: Lamiales
- Family: Acanthaceae
- Genus: Xerothamnella
- Species: X. parvifolia

Binomial name
- Xerothamnella parvifolia C.T White
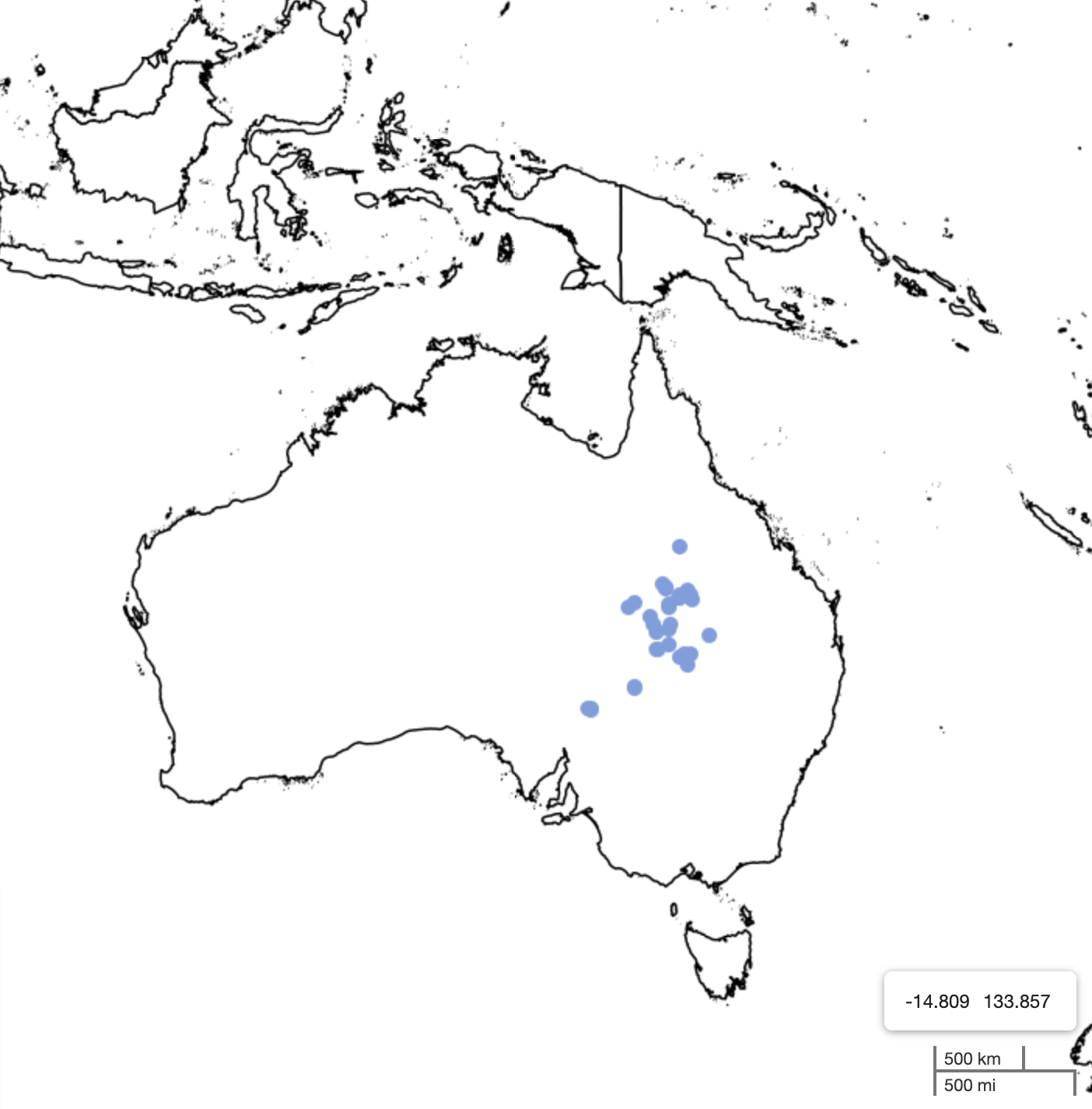

= Xerothamnella parvifolia =

Species of plant

Xerothamnella parvifolia, commonly known as the small-leaved little dry shrub and regionally in South Australia as the freckled duck, is a flowering shrub in the family of Acanthaceae. The species occurs in south-west Queensland, far north-west New South Wales and the Flinders Ranges of South Australia, where it inhabits rocky hillsides, stony rises and chenopod shrublands in arid and semi-arid environments.

== Taxonomy and etymology ==
X. parvifolia was first formally described by Cyril Tenison White in 1944. The genus Xerothamnella was originally regarded as monotypic, containing only X. parvifolia. A second species, Xerothamnella herbacea, was subsequently recognised by R.M Barker, leaving the genus with only two recognised species worldwide making the genus one of the smallest endemic genera within Australian Acanthaceae flora.

The name Xerothamnella is derived from the Greek words xiros, meaning "dry" and thamnos meaning "shrub", referring to the arid environments occupied by the species and shrubby appearance.The specific epithet parvifolia is derived from Latin words parvus meaning "small" and Folium meaning "leaf" referring to the species small leaves. Together, interpreted as "small-leaved dry shrub", which accurately reflects the species characteristic foliage and occurrence in arid and semi arid regions.

== Description ==
Xerothamnella parvifolia is a woody, low growing perennial shrub that grows to approximately 1 m in height. Plants generally sparse, although mature plants may form dense, tangled and spreading clumps. Branches intricate, longitudinally furrowed with short flat eglandular hairs. Leaves are sessile and elliptic, 4–10 mm long and up to 3 mm wide. Leaves are small, thick and generally concentrated on younger stems. The Following, grazing branchlets exhibit a dense and prickly appearance.

Flowers are produced singly, or occasionally in small groups in upper leaf axils, the corolla is distinctly bilabiate (two-lipped), 4-lobed lobe, white upper lip marked with red spots at the base. The lower lip is smooth and hairless, the interior is wholly red and the exterior is white. The corolla is tubular in shape with outwardly sparse hairs and 4.5mm long. The flowers possess two stamens, a characteristic feature of many members of the Acanthaceae.

== Ecology ==
Flowering period can be hard to predict and often opportunistic corresponding with rainfall, records show that flowering period can extend from October through to April. Following flowering, plants produce smooth fruit capsules approximately 7–8.5 mm long. Capsules contains 1-2 seeds 4 mm long and 3 mm wide that are brown and display a textured outer layer known as Tubercle. Published information on the reproductive ecology of X. parvifolia is limited, however available evidence suggests that the species has lower reproductive output than X. herbacea.

== Distribution and habitat ==
Xerothamnella parvifolia is endemic to arid inland Australia and occurs in Queensland, New South Wales and South Australia. The species has been recorded from the Flinders Ranges of South Australia, Channel Country IBRA bioregion in south-west Queensland, and far north-western New South Wales. The species estimated area of occupancy is 244 km2 and extent of occupancy is 284,684.695 km2, these estimates reflect the populations highly fragmented and disjunct distribution. X. parvifolia has been recorded at nine know sites, seven in Queensland, is associated with reddish clay soil and Acacia cambagei woodlands, where X. parvifolia is more broadly distributed and yields larger populations. In the Idalia National Park 100,000 individuals across 10 populations have been recorded.

In South Australia, populations are isolated to one locality occur principally on clay soils, rocky slopes and gullies within arid shrubland and gibber chenopod shrubland formations, including Bluebush shrublands on stony rises and downs, and may be associated with Casuarina pauper and Silver mallee Eucalyptus gillii woodlands. In 2019, approximately 1,500 additional plants were discovered at ten sites in the Gammon Ranges of South Australia, substantially increasing the known South Australian population and demonstrating that additional populations may remain undetected in remote arid landscapes.

The only known New South Wales population occurs at Mt Poole, north-west of Milparinka, where plants grow on skeletal sandy clays on ridge tops, low Sclerophyll woodland and Chenopod shrublands dominated by Atriplex and Sclerolaena species. This population was located within a grazed area and characterised by mature pants and with limited plant recruitment.

== Threats ==
Overgrazing is considered the principal threat to X. parvifolia, grazing by feral goats (Capra hircus), rabbits (Oryctolagus cuniculus), Macropods and domestic livestock suppresses regeneration by removing leaf and stem material, reducing seed production and preventing successful seedling establishment. The isolated Mt Poole population in New South Wales is particularly vulnerable because of its restricted distribution and susceptibility to stochastic events, including drought, grazing impacts and human visitation. Additionally, lack of recruitment across known sites threatens the persistence of the species within its known range.

== Conservation Status ==
Xerothamnella parvifolia is listed as Vulnerable under Environment Protection and Biodiversity Conservation Act 1999 and Endangered under the Biodiversity Conservation Act 2016 (NSW). Conservation actions focus on reducing grazing pressure, protecting known populations and improving understanding of the species’ ecology. Priority management actions include ongoing feral pig and goat control, exclusion of rabbits and macropods from key populations through fencing, protection from visitor disturbance, exclusion of destructive mining activities from occupied habitat and monitoring of plant abundance and recruitment. Seed collection and long-term ex-situ storage have also been recommended to safeguard genetic material and support potential future translocation or population supplementation programs.

== Indigenous Conservation ==
Conservation management of X. parvifolia in South Australia includes partnerships with Indigenous ranger groups associated with the Nantawarrina Indigenous Protected Area, which have assisted in the monitoring and protection of newly discovered populations. The regional common name "freckled duck" has also been adopted in local conservation programs and community communications concerning the species.
