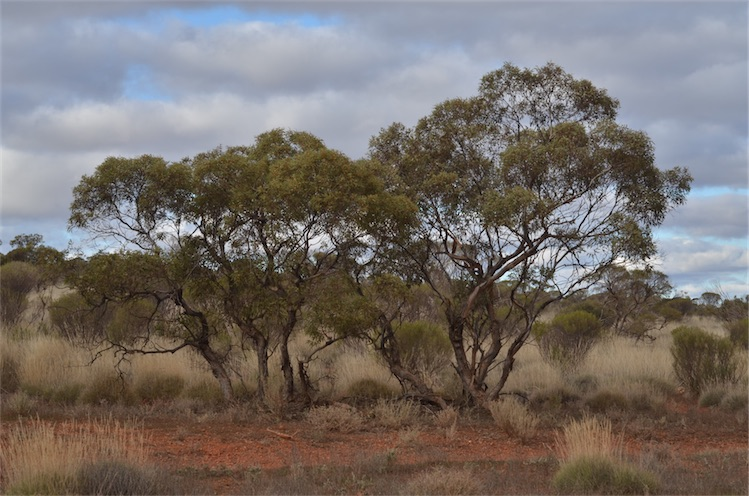
- Subspecies socialis in the Gawler Ranges

Scientific classification
- Kingdom: Plantae
- Clade: Embryophytes
- Clade: Tracheophytes
- Clade: Spermatophytes
- Clade: Angiosperms
- Clade: Eudicots
- Clade: Rosids
- Order: Myrtales
- Family: Myrtaceae
- Genus: Eucalyptus
- Species: E. socialis
- Subspecies: E. s. subsp. socialis

Trinomial name
- Eucalyptus socialis subsp. socialis D.Nicolle

= Eucalyptus socialis subsp. socialis =

Summer red mallee

Subspecies of eucalyptus

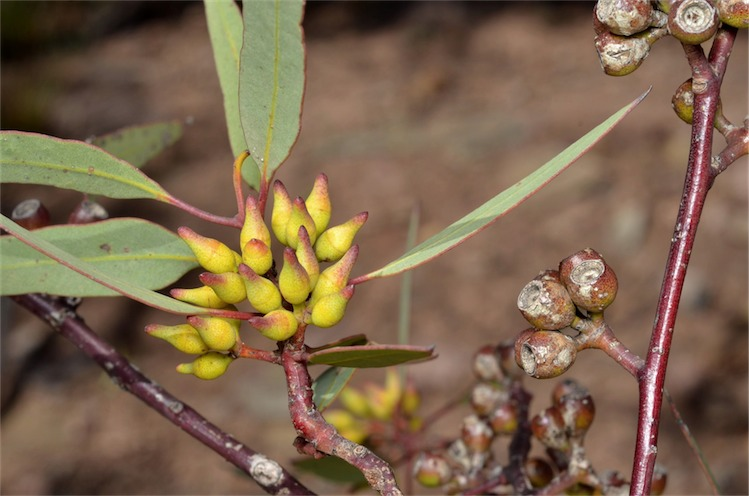
Flower buds and fruit

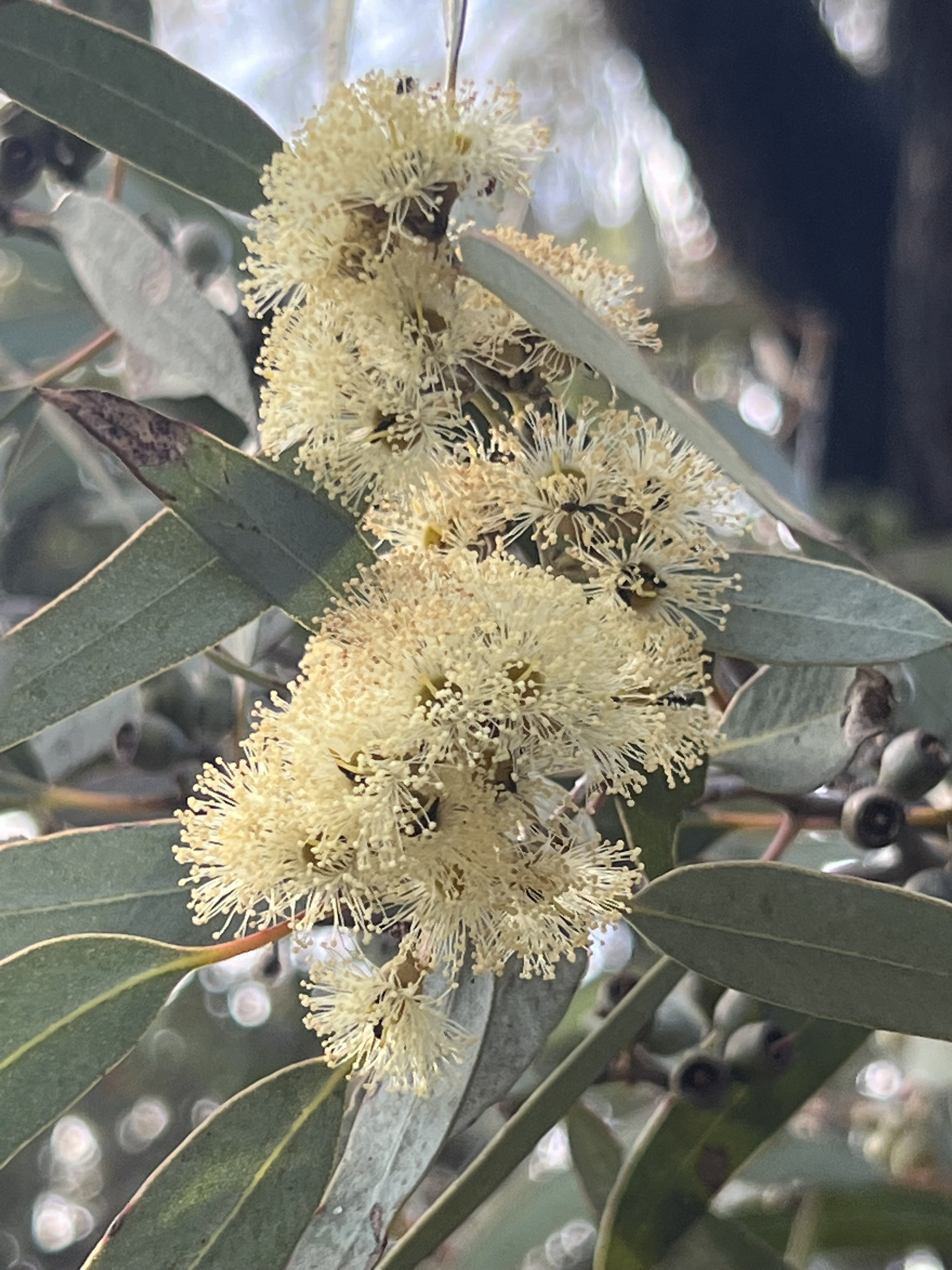
Flowers

Eucalyptus socialis subsp. socialis, commonly known as the summer red mallee, is a subspecies of mallee that is endemic to inland south-eastern Australia. It usually has rough bark on the base of the trunk, smooth bark above, lance-shaped adult leaves, flower buds in groups of between seven and eleven, pale creamy white flowers and barrel-shaped to urn-shaped or spherical fruit.

== Description ==
Eucalyptus socialis subsp. socialis is a mallee that typically grows to a height of 3–12 m (9.8–39.4 ft) and forms a lignotuber. It usually has rough, stringy to fibrous or flaky bark at the base of the trunk, smooth dull grey to cream-coloured bark above. Adult leaves are dull to slightly glossy, bluish green, narrow lance-shaped to lance-shaped, 65–125 mm (2.6–4.9 in) long, 20–21 mm (0.79–0.83 in) wide and petiolate. The flower buds are arranged in leaf axils, usually in groups of between seven and eleven, on an unbranched peduncle 4–18 mm (0.16–0.71 in) long, the individual buds on pedicels 2–8 mm (0.079–0.315 in) long. Mature buds are 8–13 mm (0.31–0.51 in) long and 3–5 mm (0.12–0.20 in) wide with a horn-shaped operculum that is longer than the floral cup. The flowers are pale creamy white and the fruit is a woody barrel-shaped to urn-shaped or spherical capsule 4.5–7 mm (0.18–0.28 in) long and wide.

== Taxonomy and naming ==
Eucalyptus socialis subsp. socialis was first formally described in 2005 by Dean Nicolle in Australian Systematic Botany.

== Distribution and habitat ==
Summer red mallee grows in mallee, often on calcareous soils and with other eucalypts, including E. dumosa, E. gracilis, E. oleosa and E. porosa. It is found in the drier parts of the south-east of South Australia, to north-western Victoria and as far east as Nyngan in New South Wales.
