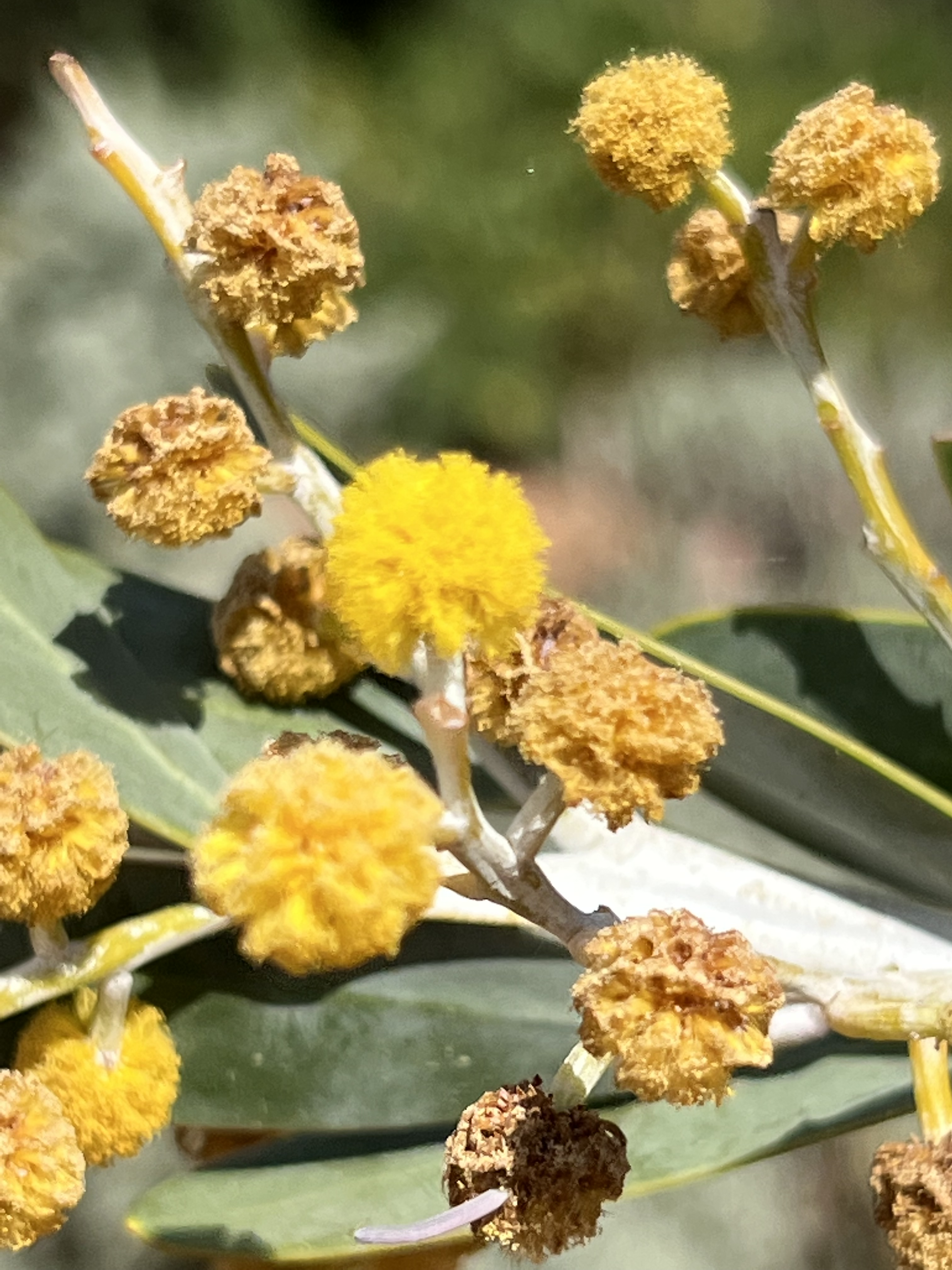

Conservation status
- Endangered (EPBC Act)

Scientific classification
- Kingdom: Plantae
- Clade: Tracheophytes
- Clade: Angiosperms
- Clade: Eudicots
- Clade: Rosids
- Order: Fabales
- Family: Fabaceae
- Subfamily: Caesalpinioideae
- Clade: Mimosoid clade
- Genus: Acacia
- Species: A. cretacea

Binomial name
- Acacia cretacea Maslin & Whibley
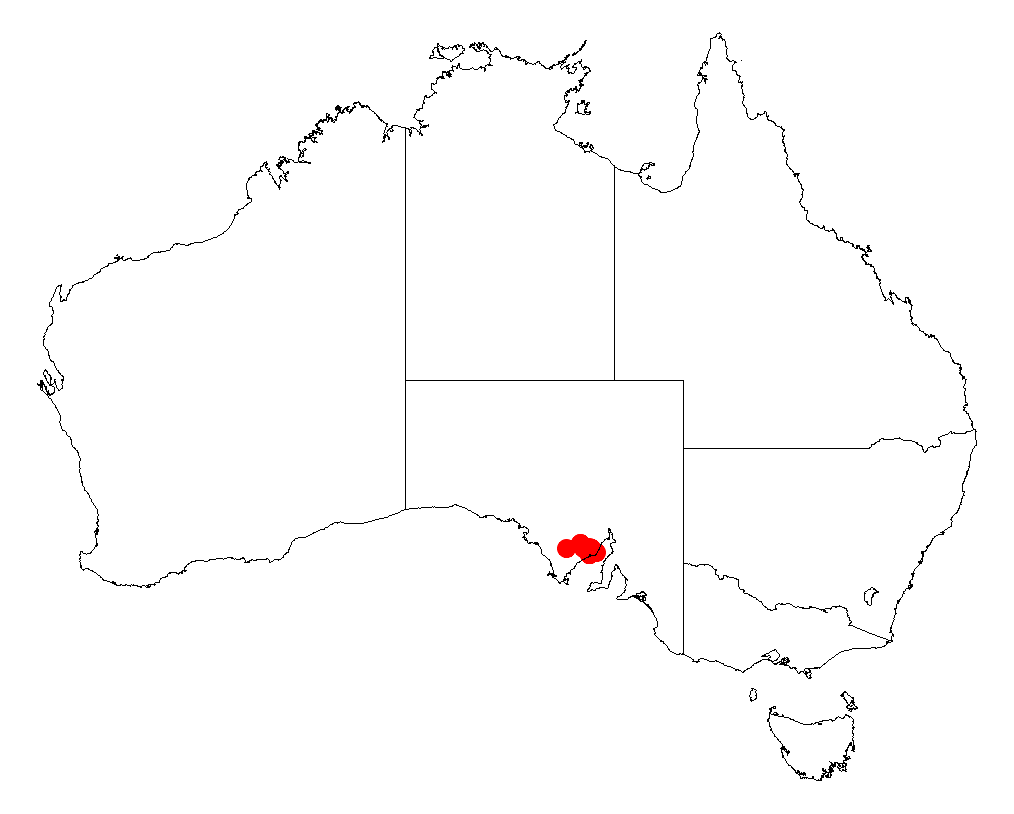
- Occurrence data from AVH

Synonyms
- Racosperma cretaceum (Maslin & Whibley) Pedley

= Acacia cretacea =

Chalky wattle

Species of plant

Acacia cretacea, also known as chalky wattle, is a species of flowering plant in the family Fabaceae and is endemic to South Australia. It is a spindly, straggy shrub or tree, with rather crowded, narrowly lance-shaped to narrowly elliptic, leathery phyllodes, spherical heads of lemon yellow to golden yellow flowers and firmly papery to thinly leathery, linear pods.

== Description ==
Acacia cretacea is a spindly, straggly shrub or tree usually that typically grows to a height of up to 4 m (13 ft) and has glabrous branchlets covered with a white, powdery bloom. Its phyllodes are rather crowded on pronounced stem-projections, narrowly lance-shaped with the narrower end towards the base, to narrowly elliptic, 70–100 mm (2.8–3.9 in) long, 9–20 mm (0.35–0.79 in) wide and thin to leathery. The flowers are borne in spherical heads on racemes 20–40 mm (0.79–1.57 in) long on peduncles 4–11 mm (0.16–0.43 in) long. The racemes are covered with a white bloom, each head 4–5 mm (0.16–0.20 in) in diameter with 35 to 45 densely arranged lemon yellow to golden yellow flowers. Flowering occurs from about July to January, and the pods are linear, firmly papery to thinly leathery, up to 90 mm (3.5 in) long, 5–6 mm (0.20–0.24 in) wide and glabrous. The seeds are black, 5–7 mm (0.20–0.28 in) long with the attachment more than half the length of the seed, and a club-shaped aril.

== Taxonomy ==
Acacia cretacea was first formally described in 1987 by the botanists Bruce Maslin and David John Edward Whibley in the journal Nuytsia from specimens collected north-east of Coolanie on the Eyre Peninsula in 1983. The specific epithet (cretacea) is a Latin word meaning chalk white in reference to the chalky coloured branchlets, flowers and seed pods.

== Distribution and habitat ==
Chalky wattle is restricted to north of Cowell on north-eastern Eyre Peninsula where it grows in deep red sand on gently undulating country with low sand ridges, in low shrubland and mallee scrub. It is commonly associated with Eucalyptus incrassata, Melaleuca uncinata and Triodia irritans. It is restricted to an area approximately 8 km^{2} (3.1 sq mi) and has an estimated population a few hundred to 5,000 individual plants. Chalky wattle grows on roadsides and in adjacent farming land.

== Conservation status ==
Acacia cretacea is listed as "endangered" under the Australian Government Environment Protection and Biodiversity Conservation Act 1999 and as "endangered" under the South Australian Government National Parks and Wildlife Act 1972. The main threats to the species are habitat fragmentation and high grazing pressure.

== See also ==
- List of Acacia species
