= Eucalyptus socialis subsp. viridans =

Green-leaved red mallee

Scientific classification
- Kingdom: Plantae
- Clade: Embryophytes
- Clade: Tracheophytes
- Clade: Spermatophytes
- Clade: Angiosperms
- Clade: Eudicots
- Clade: Rosids
- Order: Myrtales
- Family: Myrtaceae
- Genus: Eucalyptus
- Species: E. socialis
- Subspecies: E. s. subsp. viridans

Trinomial name
- Eucalyptus socialis subsp. viridans D.Nicolle

Subspecies of eucalyptus

Eucalyptus socialis subsp. viridans, commonly known as the green-leaved red mallee, is a subspecies of mallee that is endemic to south-eastern Australia. It usually has rough bark on the base of the trunk, smooth bark above, lance-shaped adult leaves, flower buds in groups of between seven and eleven, pale creamy yellow flowers and barrel-shaped to urn-shaped or spherical fruit.

== Description ==
Eucalyptus socialis subsp. viridans is a mallee that typically grows to a height of 2.5–8 m (8 ft 2 in – 26 ft 3 in) and forms a lignotuber. It usually has rough, loose, fibrous or flaky bark at the base of the trunk, smooth tan to grey bark above. Adult leaves are the same shade of dull to glossy green on both sides, narrow lance-shaped to lance-shaped, 75–132 mm (3.0–5.2 in) long and 15–28 mm (0.59–1.10 in) wide and petiolate. The flower buds are arranged in leaf axils usually in groups of between seven and eleven, on an unbranched peduncle 4–18 mm (0.16–0.71 in) long, the individual buds on pedicels 2–8.5 mm (0.079–0.335 in) long. Mature buds are smooth, 9–18 mm (0.35–0.71 in) long and 4–6 mm (0.16–0.24 in) wide with a horn-shaped operculum that is longer than the floral cup. The flowers are pale creamy yellow and the fruit is a woody barrel-shaped to urn-shaped or spherical capsule 9–18 mm (0.35–0.71 in) long and 4–6 mm (0.16–0.24 in) wide.

== Taxonomy and naming ==
Eucalyptus socialis subsp. viridans was first formally described in 2005, by Dean Nicolle in Australian Systematic Botany from specimens collected near Minlaton in 1977. The epithet viridans is from the Latin viridis meaning "green", referring to the colour of the leaves of this subspecies.

== Distribution and habitat ==
The green-leaved red mallee grows in mallee in soils overlying limestone, often with other eucalypts, including E. calcareana, E. gracilis and E. phenax. It is found on the Eyre and Yorke Peninsulas, Kangaroo Island and as far east as Ngarkat in South Australia. There are also a few records in the far west of Victoria.
