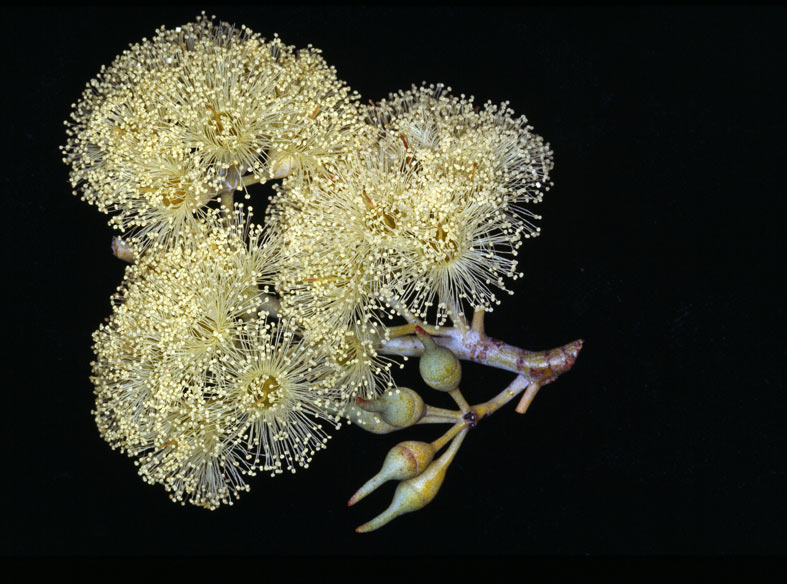
- Flower buds and flowers of subspecies eucentrica

Scientific classification
- Kingdom: Plantae
- Clade: Embryophytes
- Clade: Tracheophytes
- Clade: Spermatophytes
- Clade: Angiosperms
- Clade: Eudicots
- Clade: Rosids
- Order: Myrtales
- Family: Myrtaceae
- Genus: Eucalyptus
- Species: E. socialis
- Subspecies: E. s. subsp. eucentrica

Trinomial name
- Eucalyptus socialis subsp. eucentrica (L.A.S.Johnson & K.D.Hill) D.Nicolle

Synonyms
- Eucalyptus eucentrica L.A.S.Johnson & K.D.Hill

= Eucalyptus socialis subsp. eucentrica =

Inland red mallee

Subspecies of eucalyptus

Eucalyptus socialis subsp. eucentrica, commonly known as the inland red mallee, is a subspecies of mallee that is endemic to inland Australia. It usually has rough bark on the base of the trunk, smooth bark above, lance-shaped adult leaves, flower buds in groups of between seven and eleven, pale creamy yellow flowers and barrel-shaped to urn-shaped or spherical fruit.

== Description ==
Eucalyptus socialis subsp. eucentrica is a mallee that typically grows to a height of 3–10 m (9.8–32.8 ft) and forms a lignotuber. It usually has rough, loose, fibrous or flaky bark at the base of the trunk, smooth tan to grey bark above. Adult leaves are the same shade of dull bluish green on both sides, lance-shaped, 70–125 mm (2.8–4.9 in) long and 15–26 mm (0.59–1.02 in) wide and petiolate. The branchlets and flower buds have a waxy covering. The flower buds are arranged in leaf axils usually in groups of between seven and eleven, on an unbranched peduncle 4–18 mm (0.16–0.71 in) long, the individual buds on pedicels 2–8 mm (0.079–0.315 in) long. Mature buds are 10–13 mm (0.39–0.51 in) long and 4–6 mm (0.16–0.24 in) wide with a horn-shaped operculum that is longer than the floral cup. The flowers are pale creamy yellow and the fruit is a woody barrel-shaped to urn-shaped or spherical capsule 5–8 mm (0.20–0.31 in) long and 4.5–7.5 mm (0.18–0.30 in) wide.

== Taxonomy and naming ==
In 1991, Lawrie Johnson and Ken Hill first formally described Eucalyptus eucentrica in the journal Telopea from specimens collected near Erldunda in the Northern Territory. In 2005, Dean Nicolle reduced the species to a subspecies of E. socialis as E. socialis subsp. eucentrica, publishing the change in Australian Systematic Botany. The change has been accepted by the Australian Plant Census. The epithet eucentrica is derived from ancient Greek word elements meaning "well" and "of the centre", referring to the subspecies' wide distribution in central Australia.

== Distribution and habitat ==
Inland red mallee grows in mallee, often in stony places and with other eucalypts, including E. gamophylla and E. oxymitra. It is widespread from the Gascoyne region of Western Australia to the southern Northern Territory and north-western South Australia, with scattered populations in central Queensland.

== Conservation status ==
This mallee subspecies is classified as "not threatened" by the Western Australian Government Department of Parks and Wildlife.
