= Xerothamnella =

Scientific classification
- Kingdom: Plantae
- Clade: Embryophytes
- Clade: Tracheophytes
- Clade: Angiosperms
- Clade: Eudicots
- Clade: Asterids
- Order: Lamiales
- Family: Acanthaceae
- Subfamily: Acanthoideae
- Tribe: Justicieae
- Genus: Xerothamnella; C.T.White

Species
- See text

Genus of flowering plants

Xerothamnella is a genus of flowering plants in the family Acanthaceae, native to Queensland, Australia. A molecular study shows that it is nested within Peristrophe.

== Species ==
Currently accepted species include:

- Xerothamnella herbacea R.M.Barker
- Xerothamnella parvifolia C.T.White
