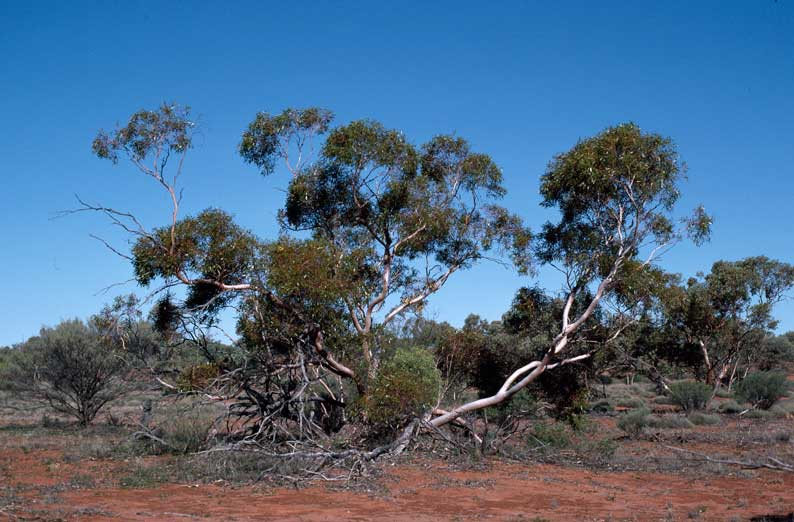
- Eucalyptus concinna near Cook, S.A.

Conservation status
- Least Concern (IUCN 3.1)

Scientific classification
- Kingdom: Plantae
- Clade: Embryophytes
- Clade: Tracheophytes
- Clade: Spermatophytes
- Clade: Angiosperms
- Clade: Eudicots
- Clade: Rosids
- Order: Myrtales
- Family: Myrtaceae
- Genus: Eucalyptus
- Species: E. concinna

Binomial name
- Eucalyptus concinna Maiden & Blakely

Synonyms
- Eucalyptus meeboldii Blakely; Eucalyptus ochrophylla Maiden & Blakely

= Eucalyptus concinna =

Victoria Desert mallee

Species of eucalyptus

Eucalyptus concinna, commonly known as the Victoria Desert mallee, is a mallee or small tree that is endemic to Australia. It usually has rough, grey-brown on the lower part of its trunk, smooth bark above, lance-shaped adult leaves, flower buds in groups of between seven and eleven, white flowers and cup-shaped fruit. It has a widespread distribution in South Australia and Western Australia, centred on the Great Victoria Desert.

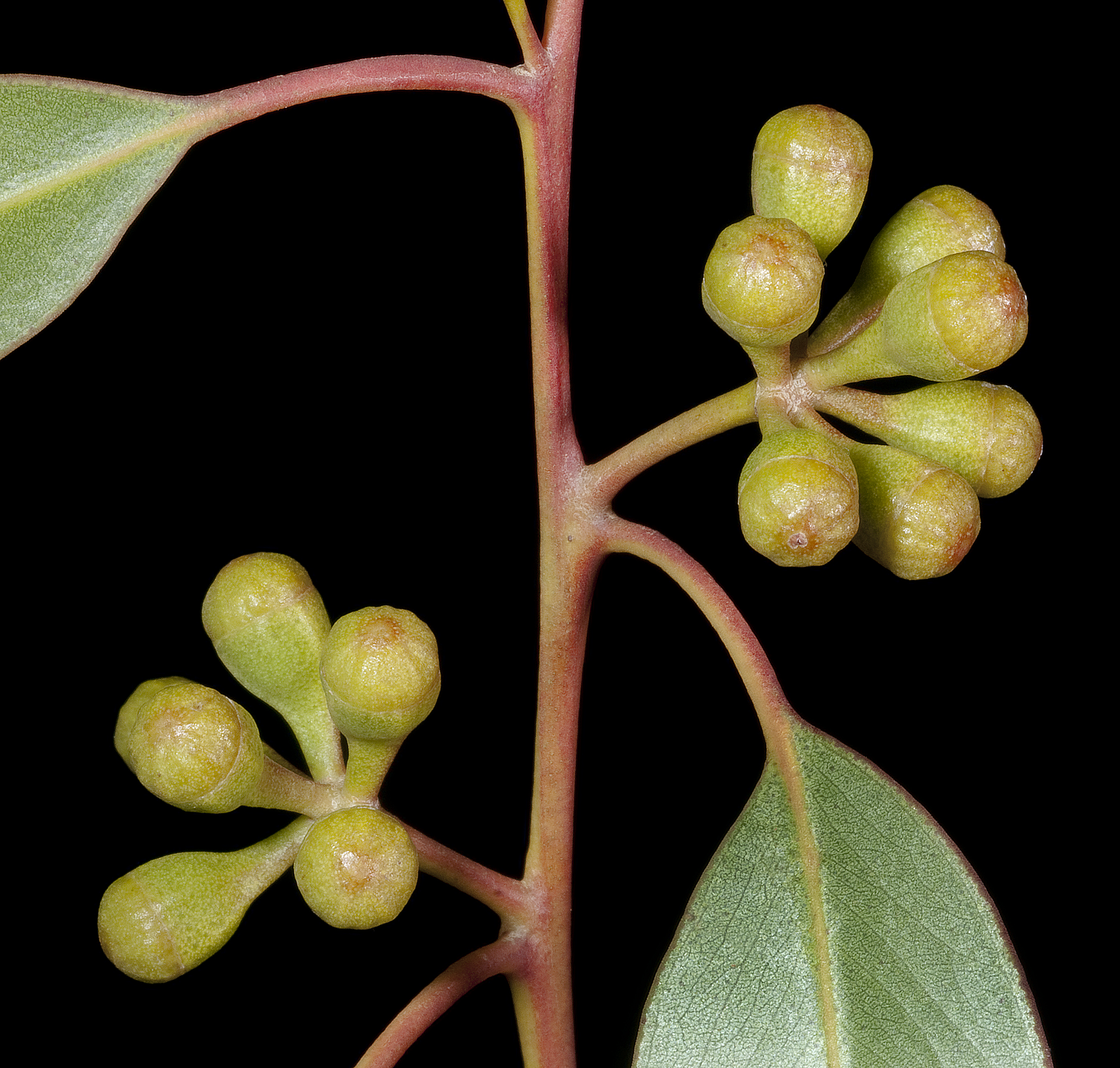
Flower buds

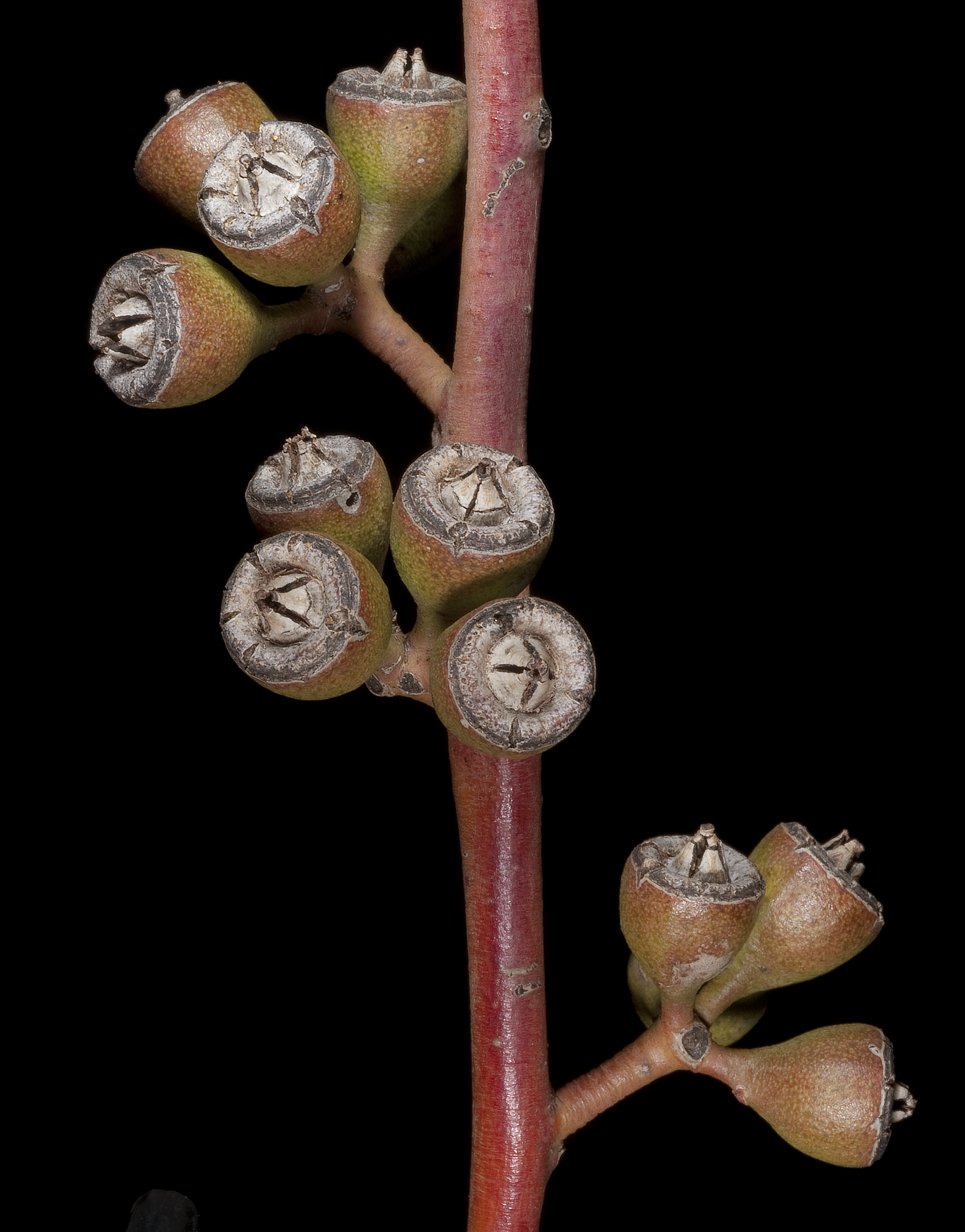
Fruit

== Description ==
Eucalyptus concinna is a mallee that typically grows to a height of 6 m (20 ft) or sometimes a tree to 8 m (26 ft) and forms a lignotuber. It has rough grey-brown, thick to flaky for the lower half of the trunk with pale grey or coppery smooth bark above. Young plants and coppice regrowth have stems that are square in cross section, and egg-shaped to broadly lance-shaped leaves that are 45–80 mm (1.8–3.1 in) long and 23–37 mm (0.91–1.46 in) wide. Adult leaves are glossy green and arranged alternately with a blade that is lance-shaped, 73–140 mm (2.9–5.5 in) long and 8–20 mm (0.31–0.79 in) wide on a petiole 10–20 mm (0.39–0.79 in) long. The flower buds are arranged in groups of seven, nine or eleven in leaf axils on and unbranched peduncle 7–15 mm (0.28–0.59 in) long, the individual buds on a pedicel 2–9 mm (0.079–0.354 in) long. Mature buds are oblong to pear-shaped, 6–12 mm (0.24–0.47 in) long and 4–10 mm (0.16–0.39 in) wide with a conical, rounded, flattened or turban-shaped, operculum 2–4 mm (0.079–0.157 in) long that is wider than the floral cup at the join. The buds are often orange or red immediately before flowering. Flowering occurs sporadically, probably depending on rainfall and the flowers are white. The fruit is a woody, cup-shaped, sometimes conical capsule 5–12 mm (0.20–0.47 in) long and 6–11 mm (0.24–0.43 in) wide on a pedicel 1–8 mm (0.039–0.315 in) long.

== Taxonomy ==
Eucalyptus concinna was first formally described by the botanists Joseph Maiden and William Blakely in 1929 from a specimen collected by Richard Helms in 1891 during the Elder Exploring Expedition. The specific epithet (concinna) is a Latin word meaning "well-arranged", "skilfully joined", "beautiful" or "striking", "probably referring to the habit and overall appearance of the plant".

== Distribution ==
Victoria Desert mallee grows in red sand or red clayey sand or sandy loam in sandplains or sandhill areas. It is distributed throughout the Goldfields-Esperance and Mid West regions of Western Australia and the west of South Australia as far east as the Gawler Ranges.

== Conservation status ==
This eucalypt is classified as "not threatened" in Western Australia by the Western Australian Government Department of Parks and Wildlife.

== See also ==
- List of Eucalyptus species
