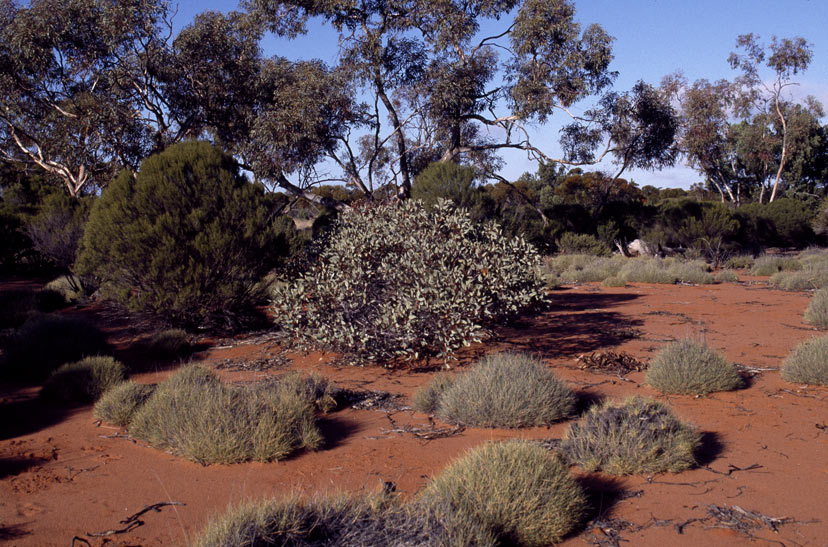
- Eucalyptus pimpiniana in the Great Victoria Desert

Conservation status
- Priority Three — Poorly Known Taxa (DEC)

Scientific classification
- Kingdom: Plantae
- Clade: Embryophytes
- Clade: Tracheophytes
- Clade: Spermatophytes
- Clade: Angiosperms
- Clade: Eudicots
- Clade: Rosids
- Order: Myrtales
- Family: Myrtaceae
- Genus: Eucalyptus
- Species: E. pimpiniana

Binomial name
- Eucalyptus pimpiniana Maiden

= Eucalyptus pimpiniana =

Pimpin mallee

Species of eucalyptus

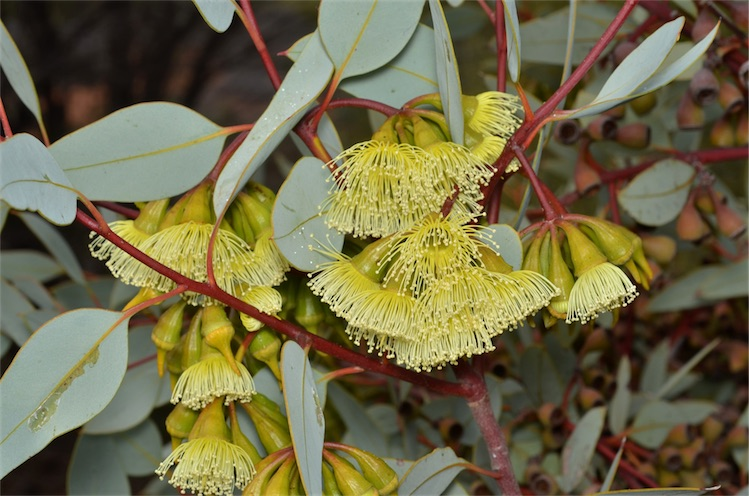
Flower buds and flowers

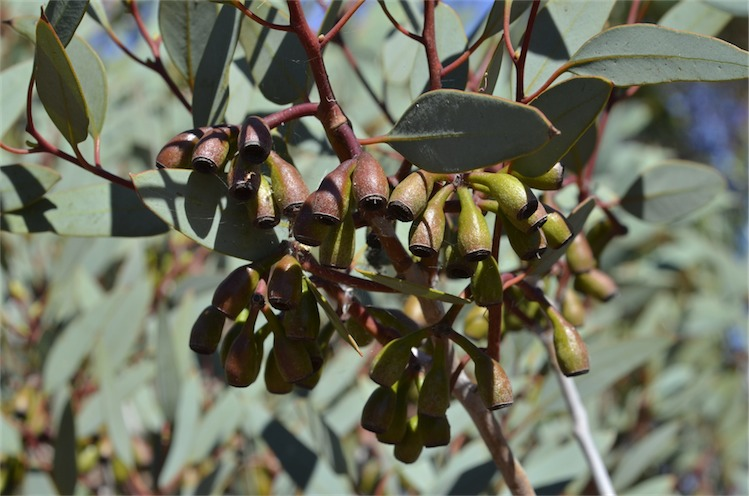
Fruit

Eucalyptus pimpiniana, commonly known as the pimpin mallee, is a species of shrubby mallee that is endemic to the Great Victoria Desert of South Australia and Western Australia. It has smooth, mottled bark, lance-shaped adult leaves, flower buds in group of between seven and nineteen, yellow flowers and cylindrical to barrel-shaped fruit.

== Description ==
Eucalyptus pimpiniana is a shrubby mallee that typically grows to a height of 2 m (6 ft 7 in) and forms a lignotuber. It has smooth, mottled salmon-coloured, grey and brownish bark. Young plants and coppice regrowth have greenish grey, lance-shaped to egg-shaped leaves that are 60–80 mm (2.4–3.1 in) long and 25–40 mm (0.98–1.57 in) wide and petiolate. Adult leaves are the same shade of dull bluish green on both sides, lance-shaped, 65–140 mm (2.6–5.5 in) long and 17–33 mm (0.67–1.30 in) wide, tapering to a petiole 15–25 mm (0.59–0.98 in) long. The flower buds are arranged in leaf axils in groups of between seven and nineteen on an unbranched peduncle 12–35 mm (0.47–1.38 in) long, the individual buds on pedicels 6–13 mm (0.24–0.51 in) long. Mature buds are oval to pear-shaped, 20–33 mm (0.79–1.30 in) long and 7–10 mm (0.28–0.39 in) wide with a beaked operculum. Flowering is spasmodic but has been observed in January, July and October and the flowers are yellow. The fruit is a woody, cylindrical to barrel-shaped capsule 14–22 mm (0.55–0.87 in) long and 9–13 mm (0.35–0.51 in) wide with the valves below rim level.

== Taxonomy and naming ==
Eucalyptus pimpiniana was first formally described in 1912 by Joseph Maiden in his book A Critical Revision of the Genus Eucalyptus from material collected by Henry Deane near Ooldea in 1909. Maiden recorded that "[t]he proposed specific name is from the native name of the plant".

== Distribution and habitat ==
Pimpin mallee grows in red sand on sand dunes and sand plains in the southern half of the Great Victoria Desert from near Barton in South Australia to near Lake Minigwal in Western Australia.

== Conservation status ==
This eucalypt is classified as "Priority Three" in Western Australia, by the Western Australian Government Department of Parks and Wildlife, meaning that it is poorly known and known from only a few locations but is not under imminent threat.

== See also ==
- List of Eucalyptus species
