= Xerothamnella herbacea =

Conservation status
- Endangered (EPBC Act)

Scientific classification
- Kingdom: Plantae
- Clade: Tracheophytes
- Clade: Angiosperms
- Clade: Eudicots
- Clade: Asterids
- Order: Lamiales
- Family: Acanthaceae
- Genus: Xerothamnella
- Species: X. herbacea

Binomial name
- Xerothamnella herbacea R.M.Barker, 1986

Species of flowering plant

Xerothamnella herbacea is a species of plant in the acanthus family that is endemic to Australia.

== Description ==
The species is a sprawling perennial herb growing to 30 cm in height. The stems can root at the nodes where they touch the soil. The soft, linear to narrowly ovate leaves are dark green above and pale beneath. The small, bright pink to mauve flowers occur in the upper leaf axils. The hairy, club-shaped fruits are 9 mm long.

== Distribution and habitat ==
The species is found in the Brigalow Belt South IBRA bioregion of south-eastern Queensland, in shaded situations, often in plant litter, in brigalow dominated plant communities with gilgais on heavy clay soils.

== Conservation ==
The species is listed as Endangered under both Australia's EPBC Act and Queensland's Nature Conservation Act. It is threatened both by competition with invasive plants and by altered fire regimes.
