= Triodia irritans =

Scientific classification
- Kingdom: Plantae
- Clade: Embryophytes
- Clade: Tracheophytes
- Clade: Spermatophytes
- Clade: Angiosperms
- Clade: Monocots
- Clade: Commelinids
- Order: Poales
- Family: Poaceae
- Subfamily: Chloridoideae
- Genus: Triodia
- Species: T. irritans

Binomial name
- Triodia irritans R.Br.

Species of plant

Triodia irritans is a species of plant that forms low and dense mounds of tough grassy vegetation. It is found on sandplains in arid regions of southern and central Australia.

The species was first described by Robert Brown in 1810. A common name for this and other species of Triodia is porcupine grass. Triodia irritans is found on red and grey sands in Western Australia, South Australia, and the Northern Territory, where it dominates a plain, dune or rocky hill as tussocks. Flowering occurs throughout the year. Its leaves are sharp and can easily penetrate human skin. The plant's flammability can lead to extremely fast-moving wildfires.

A minute species of dasyurid marsupial, Ningaui yvonneae, favours the protection and opportunities that T. irritans hummocks provide, and is a dominant component of the vegetation in which the tiny carnivore occurs.
