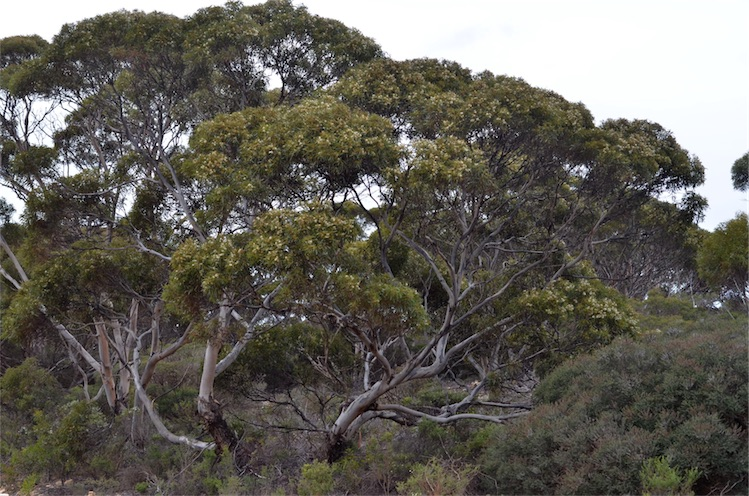
- E. gracilis in the Lincoln National Park

Scientific classification
- Kingdom: Plantae
- Clade: Embryophytes
- Clade: Tracheophytes
- Clade: Spermatophytes
- Clade: Angiosperms
- Clade: Eudicots
- Clade: Rosids
- Order: Myrtales
- Family: Myrtaceae
- Genus: Eucalyptus
- Species: E. gracilis

Binomial name
- Eucalyptus gracilis F.Muell.

= Eucalyptus gracilis =

Yorrell

Species of eucalyptus

Eucalyptus gracilis, commonly known as yorrell, snap and rattle, red mallee, white mallee or kong mallee, is a species of mallee or small tree endemic to Australia, where it is found in south-western New South Wales, Victoria, South Australia and Western Australia. It has smooth white bark, usually with rough, fibrous or flaky bark on the lower stems, linear to narrow lance-shaped adult leaves, flower buds in group of between seven and eleven and cup-shaped, cylindrical or barrel-shaped fruit.

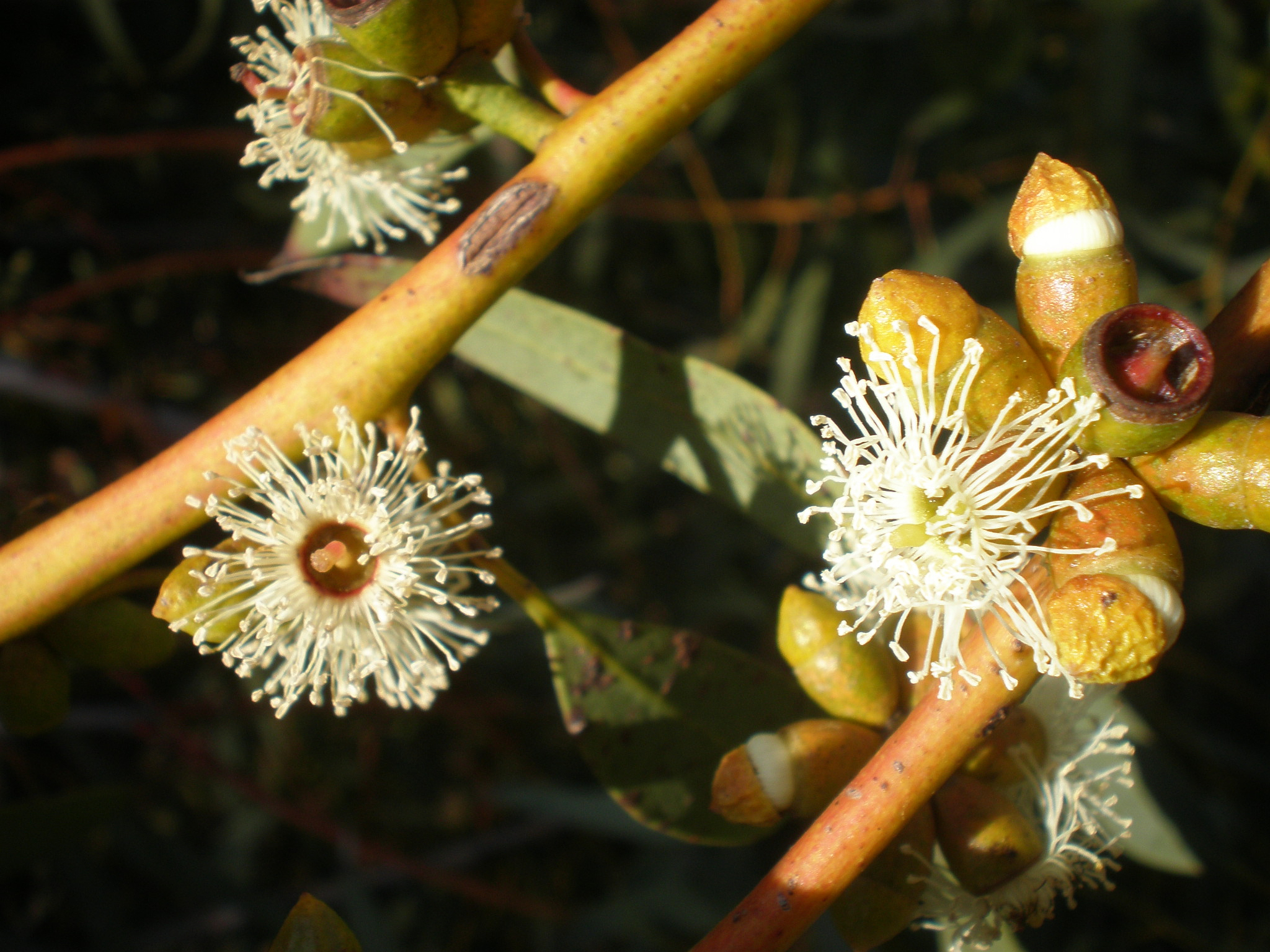
Eucalyptus gracilis flowers in the Barcelona Botanic Garden

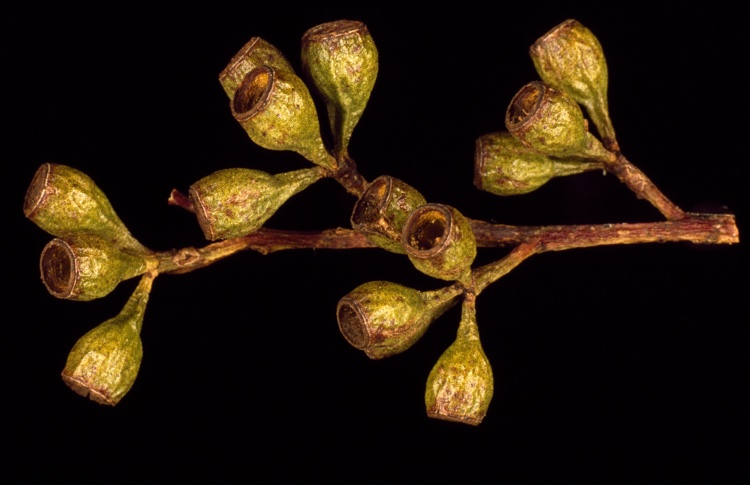
Eucalyptus gracilis fruit

== Description ==
Eucalyptus gracilis is an open to spreading, multi-stemmed mallee or tree that typically grows to a height of 7 m (23 ft) but sometimes to 20 m (66 ft). It has smooth white, grey and coppery-cream bark, but usually rough, fibrous or flaky bark at the base of the stems. Young plants and coppice regrowth have linear to narrow lance-shaped leaves 33–90 mm (1.3–3.5 in) long and 9–18 mm (0.35–0.71 in) wide. Adult leaves are arranged alternately, the same glossy green on both sides, linear to narrow lance-shaped or curved, 45–110 mm (1.8–4.3 in) long and 4–17 mm (0.16–0.67 in) wide on a petiole 5–15 mm (0.20–0.59 in) long. The flower buds are arranged in groups of seven, nine or eleven on an unbranched peduncle 5–15 mm (0.20–0.59 in) long and square in cross-section, the individual buds on pedicels 2–5 mm (0.079–0.197 in) long. Mature buds are club-shaped, 3–7 mm (0.12–0.28 in) long and 3–5 mm (0.12–0.20 in) wide with a flattened to rounded operculum. It blooms between March and October producing creamy-white flowers. The fruit is a woody cup-shaped, cylindrical or barrel-shaped capsule 4–8 mm (0.16–0.31 in) long and 3–7 mm (0.12–0.28 in) wide with the valves enclosed.

== Taxonomy and naming ==
Eucalyptus gracilis was first formally described by the botanist Ferdinand von Mueller in 1855 in Transactions and Proceedings of the Victorian Institute for the Advancement of Science, from specimens collected "in the desert on the Murray River". The species name is the Latin adjective gracilis "slender", likely referring to its branches and habit.

Eucalyptus yilgarnensis was formerly considered a subspecies of this species.

== Distribution and habitat ==
Yorrell grows on sand dunes and plains, crests of rises and along creek lines in the Eremaean and South West botanical regions of Western Australia where it grows in sandy-clay-loamy soils over limestone. It is found throughout most of southern and central South Australia where it grows in mallee shrubland in a range of soils, often over limestone. In Victoria it is confined to the north-west of the state, mostly in the Big Desert and Sunset Country, east to Manangatang. It also occurs in south western New South Wales where it is found in mallee shrubland on red aeolian sands south from Yathong and west from West Wyalong.

== Cultivation ==
E. gracilis is often cultivated in open areas, wider verges, in parks and reserves and as a shelter wind-break or for erosion control. It is also known to be good for honey production. Nectar-eating birds and insects use it for food and habitat. The yellow-tailed black cockatoo consumes the seeds of this species.

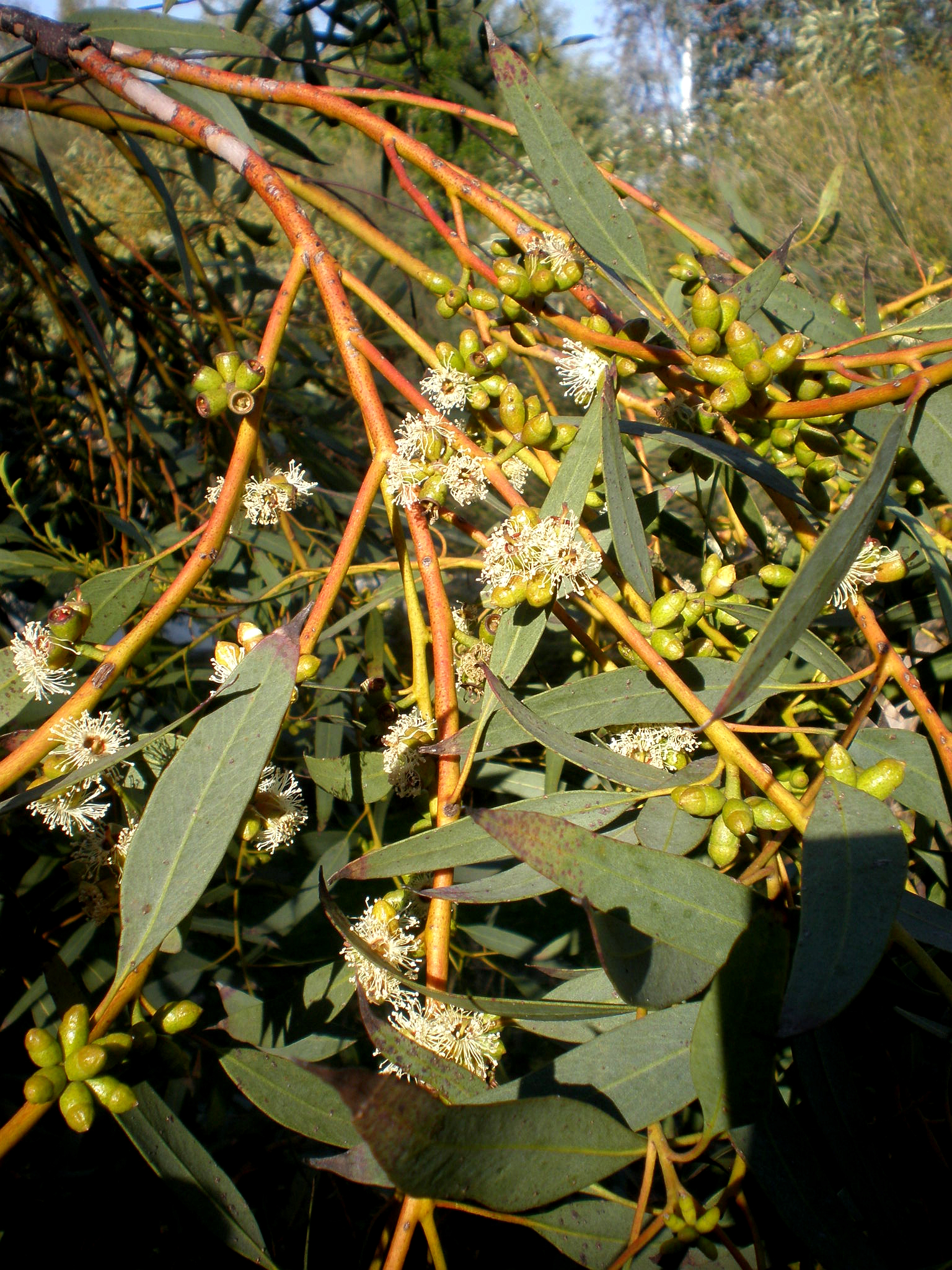
Eucalyptus gracilis foliage and blossoms

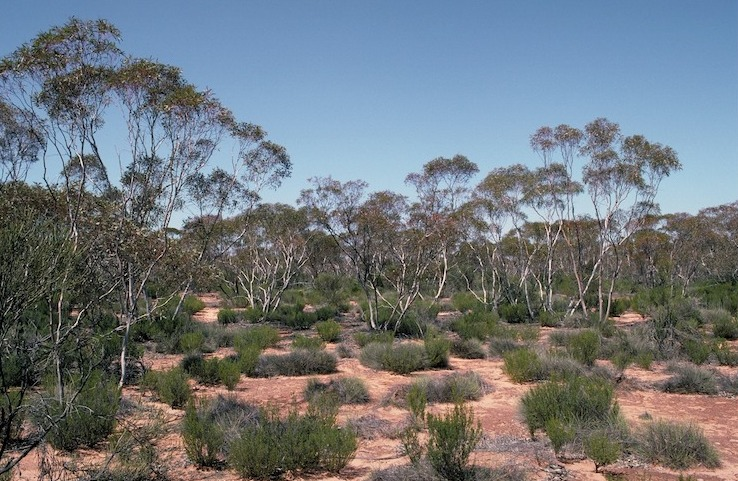
Mallees near Calperum, South Australia
