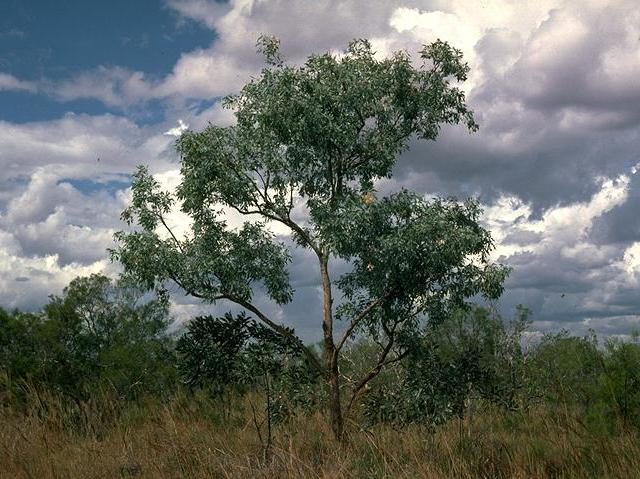
- Eucalyptus argillacea near Mount Barnett Station

Conservation status
- Least Concern (IUCN 3.1)

Scientific classification
- Kingdom: Plantae
- Clade: Embryophytes
- Clade: Tracheophytes
- Clade: Angiosperms
- Clade: Eudicots
- Clade: Rosids
- Order: Myrtales
- Family: Myrtaceae
- Genus: Eucalyptus
- Species: E. argillacea

Binomial name
- Eucalyptus argillacea W.Fitzg.

= Eucalyptus argillacea =

Mount House box

Species of eucalyptus

Eucalyptus argillacea, commonly known as Mount House box, or northern grey box is a tree that is endemic to northern Australia. It has rough, fibrous bark, lance-shaped adult leaves, flower buds usually in groups of seven, creamy white flowers and conical fruit.

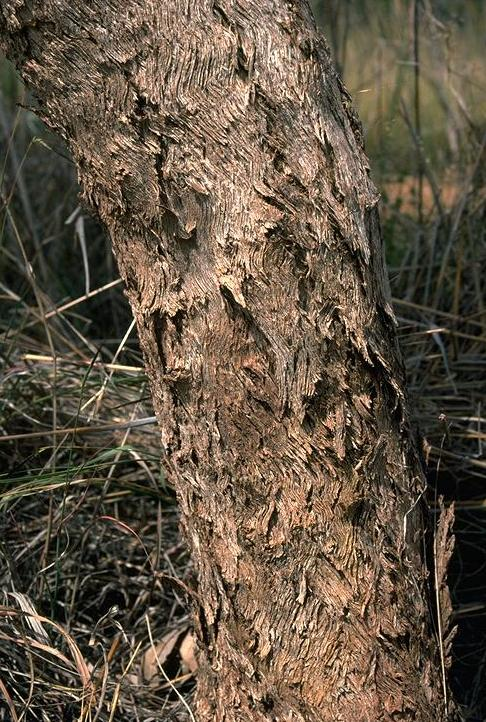
bark

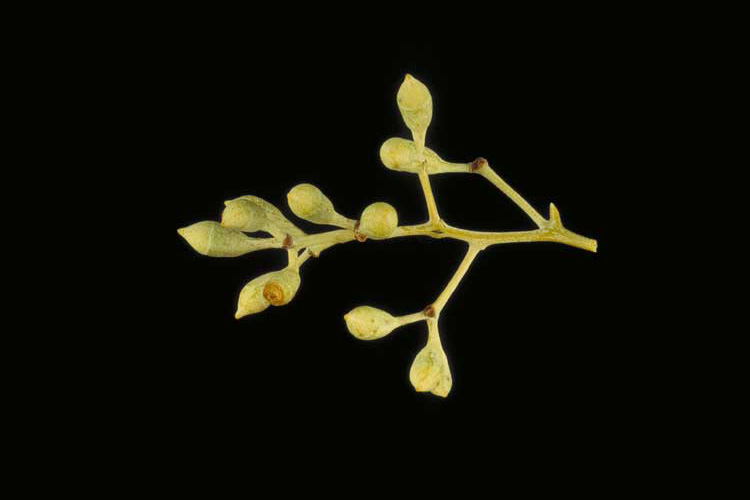
flower buds

== Description ==
Eucalyptus argillacea is a tree that typically grows to a height of 4 to 14 metres (13 to 46 ft) with rough, grey, fibrous bark on its trunk and branches. The adult leaves are elliptic to lance-shaped or egg-shaped, light green to greyish green, 50–140 mm (2.0–5.5 in) long and 7–35 mm (0.3–1 in) wide on a petiole 5–23 mm (0.20–0.91 in) long. The flower buds are arranged in groups of between three and seven on a peduncle 3–15 mm (0.1–0.6 in) long, the individual buds on a pedicel 2–5 mm (0.08–0.2 in) long. The mature buds are pear-shaped, oval or spindle-shaped, 6–10 mm (0.24–0.39 in) long and 4–6 mm (0.2–0.2 in) wide with a conical to beaked operculum 2–3 mm (0.079–0.12 in) long and 3–4 mm (0.12–0.16 in) wide. Flowering occurs from April to July or from October to December and the flowers are creamy white. The fruit is a conical capsule, 6–10 mm (0.24–0.39 in) long and 4–6 mm (0.16–0.24 in) wide.

This species is similar to other box-type eucalypts found in tropical areas including E. tectifica, E. distans and E. obconica.

== Taxonomy and naming ==
Eucalyptus argillacea was first formally described in 1918 by William Vincent Fitzgerald and the description was published in Joseph Maiden's book A Critical Revision of the Genus Eucalyptus from specimens collected by Fitzgerald in 1905 from around the base of Mount House. The specific epithet (argillacea) is a Latin word meaning "clayey", referring to the soil at the type location.

== Distribution and habitat ==
Mount House box is found along watercourses and on plains where it grows in alluvium and heavy clay soils. Populations are found only in the Kimberley region of Western Australia. George M. Chippendale (1988) recognized its occurrence also in Northern Territory and northern Queensland, synonymizing E. leucophylla Domin (now considered to be a separate taxon whose type locality is Queensland) and citing specimens G.M. Chippendale 2171 (now its precise determination withdrawn), R.E. Winkworth 1051, B. Hyland 6283 and L. Pedley 2056 (all of the last three currently re-determined as E. chlorophylla Brooker & Done).

== See also ==
- List of Eucalyptus species
