= Leioproctus parvus =

Scientific classification
- Kingdom: Animalia
- Phylum: Arthropoda
- Clade: Pancrustacea
- Class: Insecta
- Order: Hymenoptera
- Family: Colletidae
- Genus: Leioproctus
- Species: L. parvus

Binomial name
- Leioproctus parvus Maynard 2013

Synonyms
- Goniocolletes parvus Maynard, 2013

Species of bee

Leioproctus parvus, or Leioproctus (Goniocolletes) parvus, is a species of bee in the family Colletidae and subfamily Colletinae. It is endemic to Australia. It was described by Australian entomologist Glynn Maynard in 2013.

== Etymology ==
The specific epithet parvus (Latin: "little") refers to relative size.

== Description ==
Female body length is about 11 mm, male body length 9 mm. Integumental colouration is mainly black; the female metasoma orange with dark patches. The hair is mostly yellow.

== Distribution and habitat ==
The species occurs in arid inland Australia. The type locality is 32 km north-east of Eucla, in western South Australia.

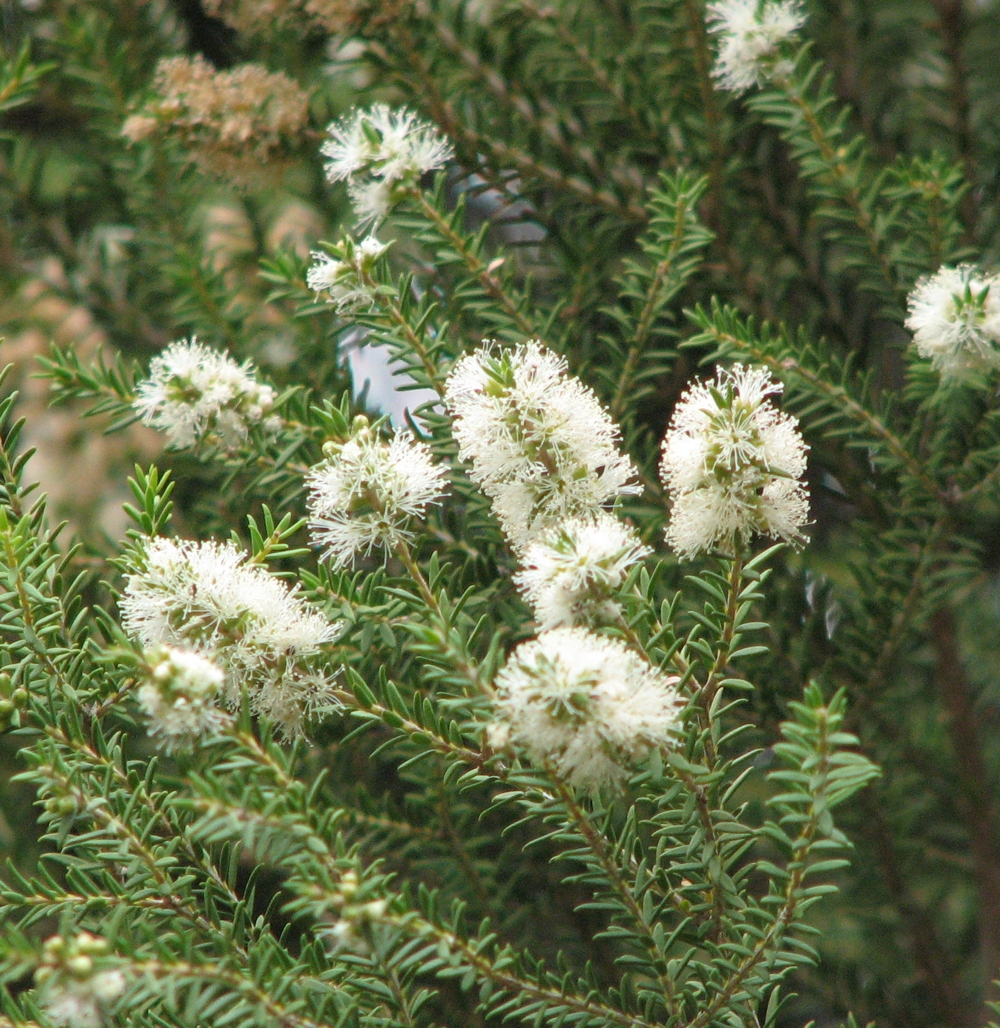
Melaleuca lanceolata flowers

== Behaviour ==
The adults are flying mellivores. Flowering plants visited by the bees include Eucalyptus argillacea, Eucalyptus oleosa, Eucalyptus socialis, Eucalyptus brachycalyx, Melaleuca lanceolata and Myoporum platycarpum.

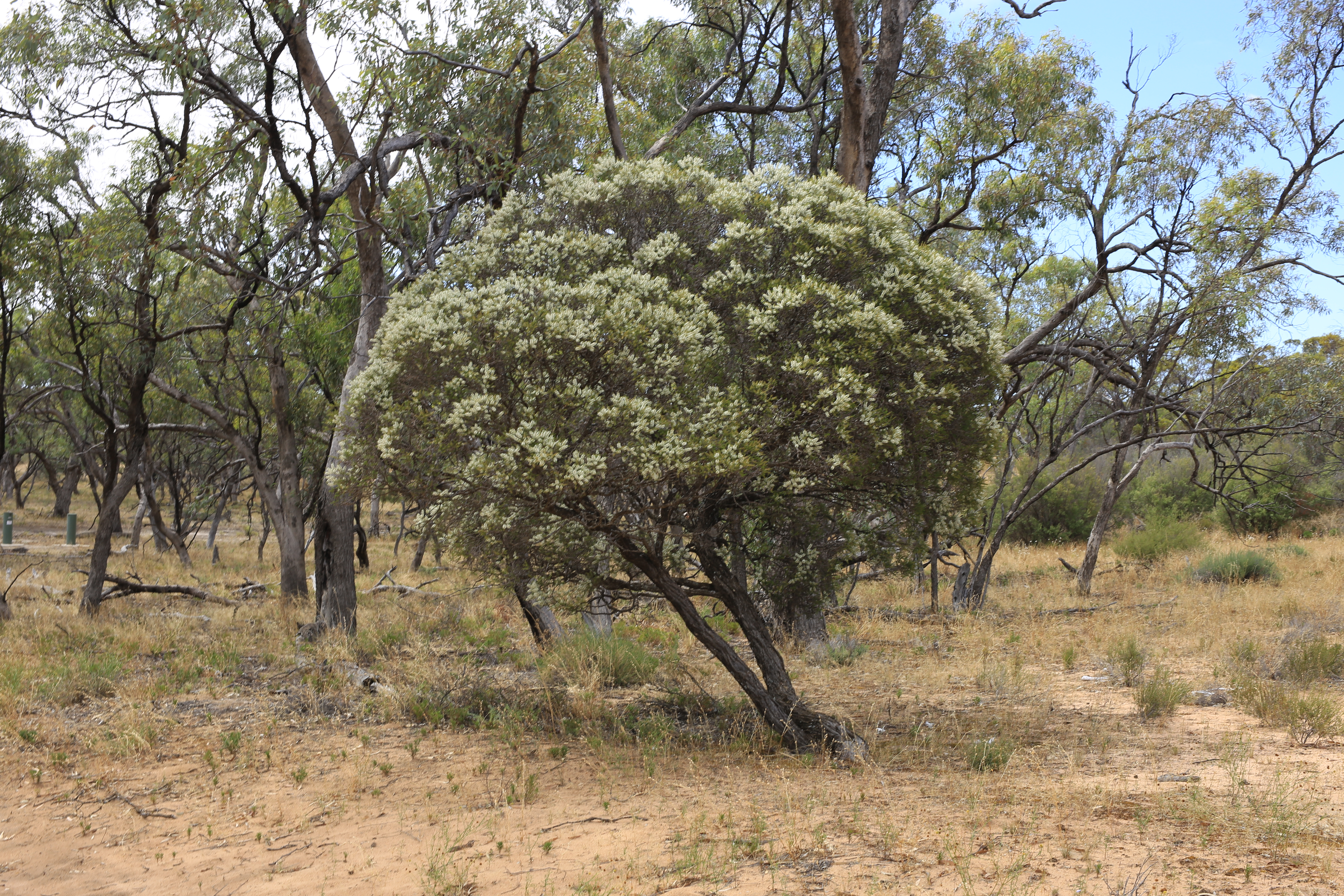
Melaleuca lanceolata (moonah), a forage plant of the bees
