= Leioproctus comatus =

Scientific classification
- Kingdom: Animalia
- Phylum: Arthropoda
- Clade: Pancrustacea
- Class: Insecta
- Order: Hymenoptera
- Family: Colletidae
- Genus: Leioproctus
- Species: L. comatus

Binomial name
- Leioproctus comatus Maynard 2013

Synonyms
- Goniocolletes comatus Maynard, 2013

Species of bee

Leioproctus comatus, or Leioproctus (Goniocolletes) comatus, is a species of bee in the family Colletidae and subfamily Colletinae. It is endemic to Australia. It was described by Australian entomologist Glynn Maynard in 2013.

== Etymology ==
The specific epithet comatus (Latin: "shaggy") is an anatomical reference to shaggy hair on the male metasoma.

== Description ==
Female body length is about 11 mm, male body length 10 mm. Integumental colouration is mainly black; the female metasoma is orange, the male black. The hair is mostly white.

== Distribution and habitat ==
The species occurs in inland southern Australia. The type locality is Lake Gilles National Park.

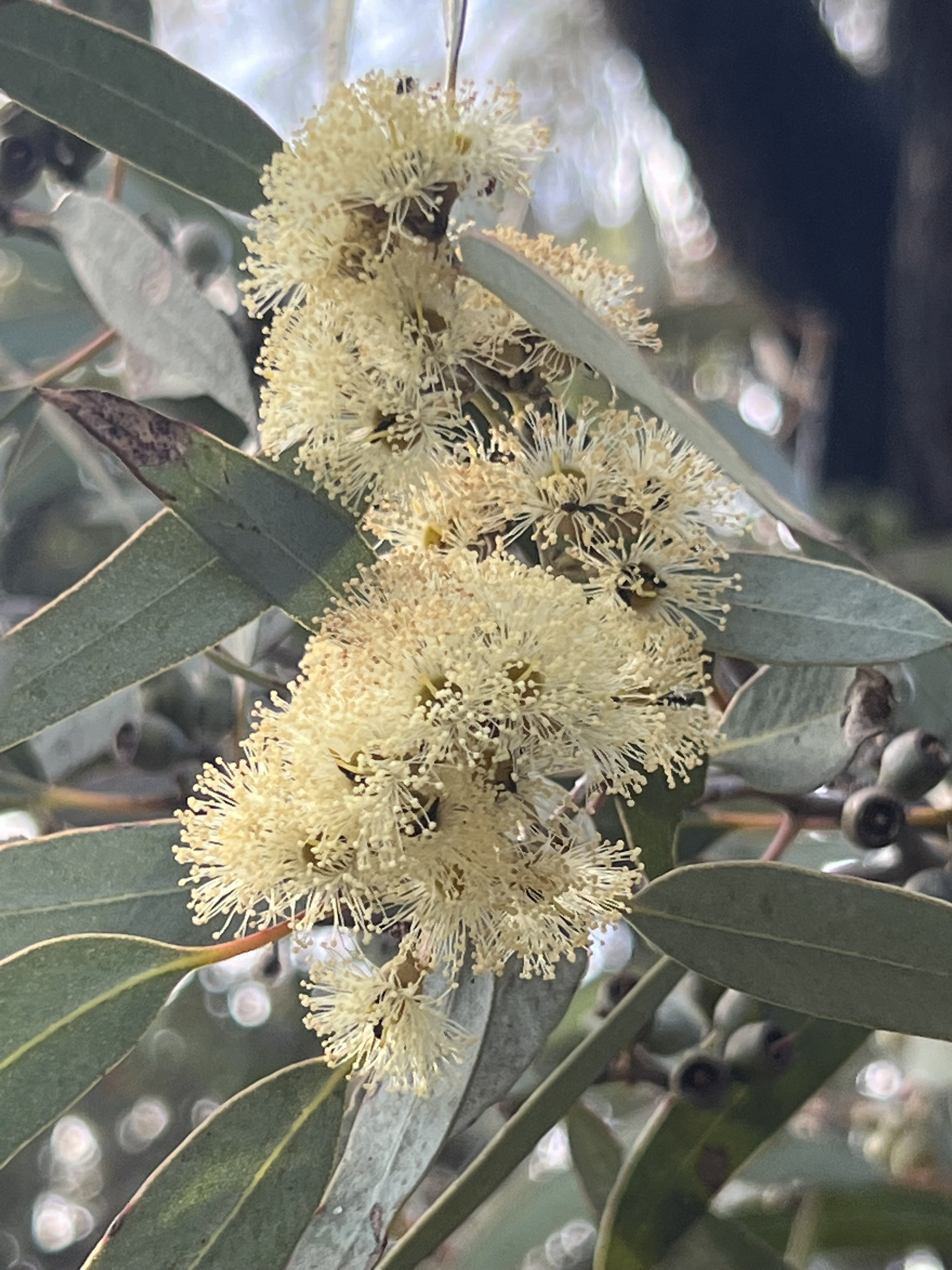
Eucalyptus socialis flowers

== Behaviour ==
The adults are flying mellivores. Flowering plants visited by the bees include Eucalyptus dumosa, Eucalyptus brachycalyx and Eucalyptus socialis, as well as Melaleuca species.

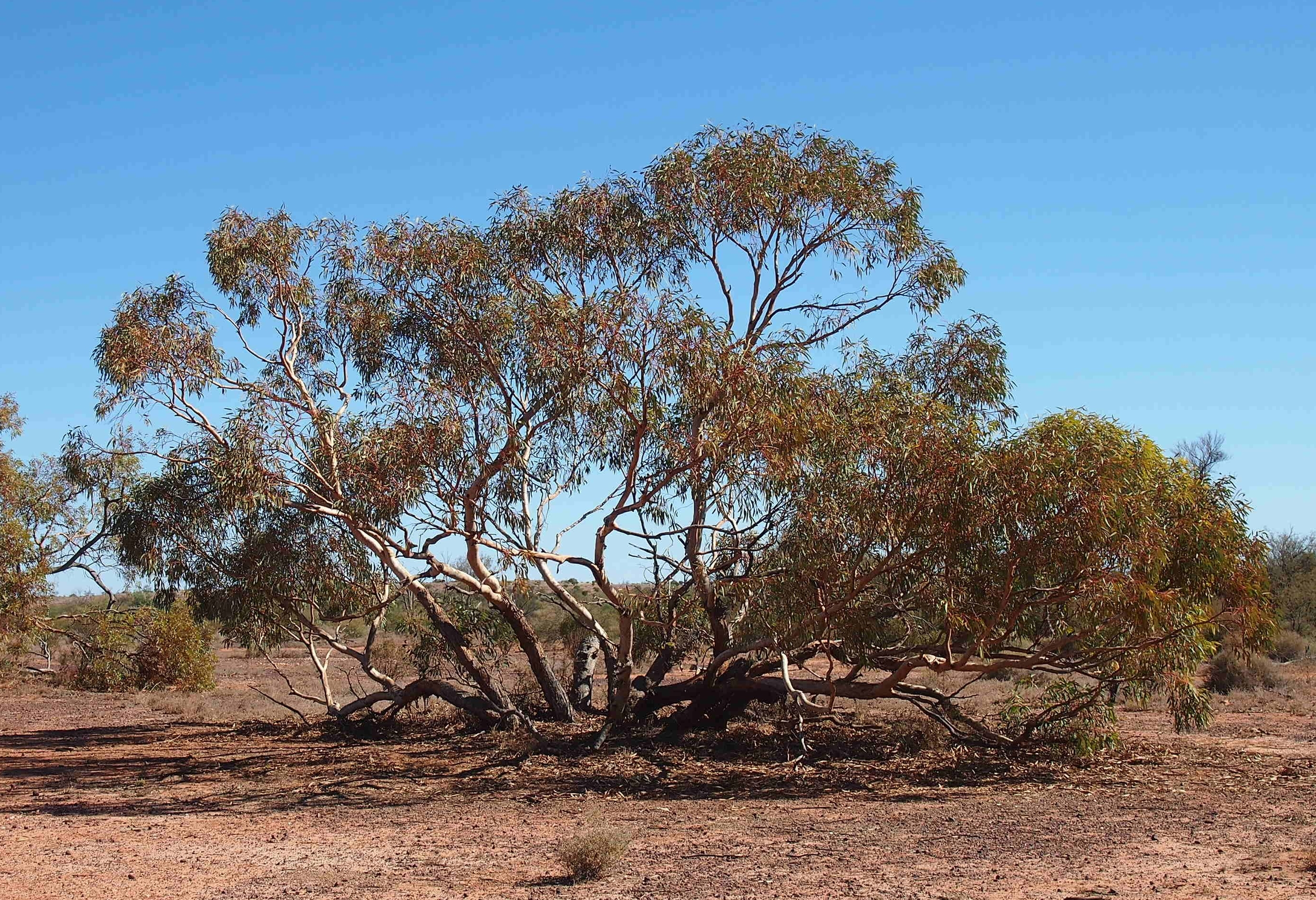
Eucalyptus socialis (red mallee), a forage plant of the bees
