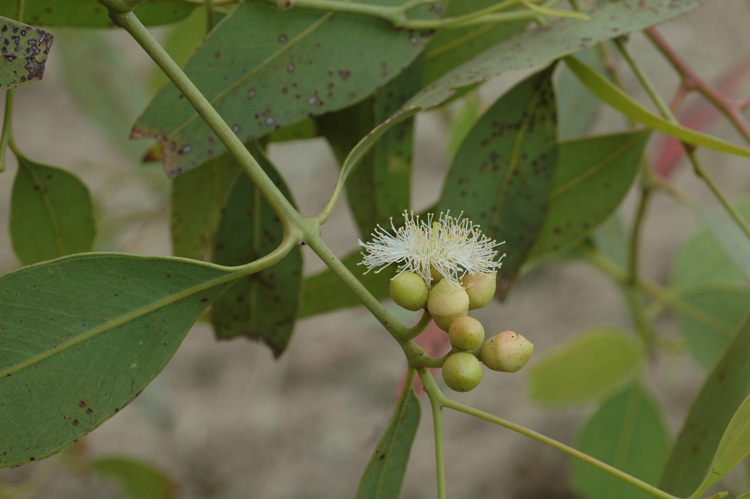
- Eucalyptus patellaris flower buds and flowers

Scientific classification
- Kingdom: Plantae
- Clade: Tracheophytes
- Clade: Angiosperms
- Clade: Eudicots
- Clade: Rosids
- Order: Myrtales
- Family: Myrtaceae
- Genus: Eucalyptus
- Species: E. patellaris

Binomial name
- Eucalyptus patellaris F.Muell.

= Eucalyptus patellaris =

Weeping box

Species of eucalyptus

Eucalyptus patellaris, commonly known as weeping box, is a species of tree that is endemic to the Northern Territory in Australia. It has rough, fibrous to flaky bark on the trunk and branches, lance-shaped or curved adult leaves, flower buds in groups of seven, white flowers and bell-shaped or cup-shaped fruit.

== Description ==
Eucalyptus patellaris is a tree that typically grows to a height of 10–18 m (33–59 ft) and forms a lignotuber. It has rough, greyish, flaky or fibrous bark on the trunk and branches. Young plants and coppice regrowth have dull green, egg-shaped leaves that are 90–135 mm (3.5–5.3 in) long and 35–60 mm (1.4–2.4 in) wide. Adult leaves are lance-shaped or curved, the same shade of green on both sides, 95–270 mm (3.7–10.6 in) long and 13–35 mm (0.51–1.38 in) wide, tapering to a petiole 8–26 mm (0.31–1.02 in) long. The flower buds are arranged on the ends of branchlets on a branched peduncle 5–25 mm (0.20–0.98 in) long, the individual buds in groups of seven on pedicels 4–12 mm (0.16–0.47 in) long. Mature buds are pear-shaped to oval, 9–16 mm (0.35–0.63 in) long and 6–9 mm (0.24–0.35 in) wide with a conical or beaked operculum. Flowering occurs from November to February and the flowers are white. The fruit is a woody, bell-shaped or cup-shaped capsule 6–12 mm (0.24–0.47 in) long and 6–13 mm (0.24–0.51 in) wide with the valves near rim level.

== Taxonomy ==
Eucalyptus patellaris was first formally described in 1859 by Ferdinand von Mueller in Journal of the Proceedings of the Linneany Society, Botany from material collected from the upper part of the Roper River. The specific epithet (patellaris) is from Latin, meaning "pan" or "knee-cap", referring to the shape of the operculum in the original, possibly diseased buds.

== Distribution and habitat ==
Weeping box grows in open forest and woodland in gentle slopes and on river flats in the Top End of the Northern Territory in scattered locations. Some sources list this species as occurring in the Kimberley region of Western Australia, but recent research indicates that these specimens are a new species, E. xerothermica.

== See also ==
- List of Eucalyptus species
