= Eucalyptus obconica =

Scientific classification
- Kingdom: Plantae
- Clade: Tracheophytes
- Clade: Angiosperms
- Clade: Eudicots
- Clade: Rosids
- Order: Myrtales
- Family: Myrtaceae
- Genus: Eucalyptus
- Species: E. obconica

Binomial name
- Eucalyptus obconica Brooker

Species of eucalyptus

Eucalyptus obconica is a species of small tree or a mallee that is endemic to the Kimberley region of Western Australia. It has rough fibrous or flaky, wavy bark on the trunk and branches, lance-shaped to curved or oblong adult leaves, flower buds in groups of seven, white flowers and conical fruit.

== Description ==
Eucalyptus obconica is a tree or mallee that typically grows to a height of 2.5–10 m (8 ft 2 in – 32 ft 10 in) high. It has rough, fibrous or flaky, wavy or tessellated bark on the trunk and branches. Young plants and coppice regrowth have dull, light green, broadly lance-shaped leaves that are up to 130 mm (5.1 in) long, 35 mm (1.4 in) wide and petiolate. Adult leaves are the same shade of dull green to bluish on both sides, lance-shaped to curved or oblong, 60–155 mm (2.4–6.1 in) long and 5–20 mm (0.20–0.79 in) wide on a petiole 5–20 mm (0.20–0.79 in) long. The flower buds are mostly arranged on the end of branchlets on a branched peduncle in groups of seven, the peduncle 2–8 mm (0.079–0.315 in) long, the individual buds sessile or almost so. Mature buds are oval, 4–5 mm (0.16–0.20 in) long, 3–4 mm (0.12–0.16 in) wide with a rounded to conical operculum. Flowering occurs between March and May and the flowers are white. The fruit is a woody, conical capsule 2–4 mm (0.079–0.157 in) long and 3–5 mm (0.12–0.20 in) wide with the valves near rim level.

== Taxonomy and naming ==
Eucalyptus obconica was first formally described in 1994 by Ian Brooker and David Kleinig in their book, Field guide to eucalypts. The specific epithet (obconicus) is Latin, meaning obconical, referring to the shape of the fruit.

== Distribution and habitat ==
This species is found on rocky hill sides in scattered locations in the central and eastern Kimberley region, where it grows in skeletal soils over sandstone or quartzite, often forming pure stands on rocky plateaus.

== Conservation status ==
This eucalypt is classified as "not threatened" by the Government of Western Australia Department of Parks and Wildlife.

== See also ==
- List of Eucalyptus species
