= Eucalyptus xerothermica =

Scientific classification
- Kingdom: Plantae
- Clade: Tracheophytes
- Clade: Angiosperms
- Clade: Eudicots
- Clade: Rosids
- Order: Myrtales
- Family: Myrtaceae
- Genus: Eucalyptus
- Species: E. xerothermica

Binomial name
- Eucalyptus xerothermica L.A.S.Johnson & K.D.Hill

Species of eucalyptus

Eucalyptus xerothermica is a species of mallee or a tree that is endemic to northern Western Australia. It has rough, fibrous or flaky bark on the trunk and branches, lance-shaped to curved adult leaves, flower buds in groups of three or seven, creamy white flowers and conical to barrel-shaped fruit.

== Description ==
Eucalyptus xerothermica is a tree or a mallee that typically grows to a height of 6 m (20 ft), sometimes 12 m (39 ft), and forms a lignotuber. Young plants and coppice regrowth have bluish to greyish green leaves that are 65–130 mm (2.6–5.1 in) long and 30–65 mm (1.2–2.6 in) wide and petiolate. Adult leaves are the same shade of green on both sides, lance-shaped to curved, 78–180 mm (3.1–7.1 in) long and 10–25 mm (0.39–0.98 in) wide, tapering to a petiole 9–27 mm (0.35–1.06 in) long. The flower buds are mostly arranged on the ends of branchlets in groups of three or seven on a branching peduncle 3–10 mm (0.12–0.39 in) long, the individual buds sessile or on pedicels up to 6 mm (0.24 in) long. Mature buds are oval, 7–8 mm (0.28–0.31 in) long and 4–5 mm (0.16–0.20 in) wide with a conical to rounded operculum. The flowers are creamy white and the fruit is a woody, conical to barrel-shaped capsule 6–11 mm (0.24–0.43 in) long and 6–9 mm (0.24–0.35 in) wide with the valves at rim level.

== Taxonomy and naming ==
Eucalyptus xerothermica was first formally described in 2000 by Lawrie Johnson and Ken Hill in the journal Telopea from specimens collected near the Fortescue River in 1983. The specific epithet (xerothermica is from ancient Greek words meaning "dry" and "hot", referring to the climate where this species grows.

== Distribution and habitat ==
This eucalypt is found on floodplains and channel banks in the Pilbara, North West Cape and nearby islands where it grows in low, open savanna.

== Conservation status ==
This species is classified as "not threatened" by the Western Australian Government Department of Parks and Wildlife.

== See also ==
- List of Eucalyptus species
