= Eucalyptus tenera =

Glazed mallee

Conservation status
- Near Threatened (IUCN 3.1)

Scientific classification
- Kingdom: Plantae
- Clade: Tracheophytes
- Clade: Angiosperms
- Clade: Eudicots
- Clade: Rosids
- Order: Myrtales
- Family: Myrtaceae
- Genus: Eucalyptus
- Species: E. tenera

Binomial name
- Eucalyptus tenera L.A.S.Johnson & K.D.Hill

Species of eucalyptus

Eucalyptus tenera, commonly known as the glazed mallee or sand mallee, is a species of mallee that is endemic to Western Australia. It has smooth bark, narrow lance-shaped to elliptical leaves, flower buds in groups of seven to eleven, lemon yellow flowers and cup-shaped to barrel-shaped fruit.

== Description ==
Eucalyptus tenera is a mallee that typically grows to a height of 2–5 m (6 ft 7 in – 16 ft 5 in) and forms a lignotuber. It has smooth greyish to brownish bark. Young plants and coppice regrowth have glossy green, linear to narrow lance-shaped leaves that are 30–90 mm (1.2–3.5 in) long and 7–25 mm (0.28–0.98 in) wide. Adult leaves are the same shade of glossy green on both sides, narrow lance-shaped to elliptical, 40–90 mm (1.6–3.5 in) long and 7–25 mm (0.28–0.98 in) wide, tapering to a petiole 5–18 mm (0.20–0.71 in) long. The flower buds are arranged in leaf axils in groups of seven to eleven on a flattened, unbranched peduncle 18–30 mm (0.71–1.18 in), the individual buds on pedicels 5–9 mm (0.20–0.35 in) long. Mature buds are elongated, 28–40 mm (1.1–1.6 in) long and 5–6 mm (0.20–0.24 in) wide with a horn-shaped operculum that is at least three times as long as the floral cup. Flowering has been recorded in November and the flowers are lemon yellow. The fruit is a woody cup-shaped to barrel-shaped capsule 7–10 mm (0.28–0.39 in) long and 6–11 mm (0.24–0.43 in) wide with the valves at rim level.

== Taxonomy and naming ==
Eucalyptus tenera was first formally described in 1992 by Lawrie Johnson and Ken Hill from specimens collected by Ian Brooker near Bencubbin in 1984. The specific epithet (tenera) is from the Latin tener meaning "delicate", in comparison to the related E. eremophila and E. tephroclada.

== Distribution and habitat ==
Glazed mallee occurs over a wide are of the western and northern wheatbelt between Coorow, Chiddarcooping Rock and Lake King. It grows with other mallee species in wandoo woodland.

== Conservation status ==
This eucalypt is classified as "not threatened" by the Western Australian Government Department of Parks and Wildlife. The IUCN Red List assesses the species as Near Threatened.

== See also ==
- List of Eucalyptus species
