= Eucalyptus tephroclada =

Scientific classification
- Kingdom: Plantae
- Clade: Tracheophytes
- Clade: Angiosperms
- Clade: Eudicots
- Clade: Rosids
- Order: Myrtales
- Family: Myrtaceae
- Genus: Eucalyptus
- Species: E. tephroclada

Binomial name
- Eucalyptus tephroclada L.A.S.Johnson & K.D.Hill

Synonyms
- Eucalyptus erythronema var. roei Maiden

Species of eucalyptus

Eucalyptus tephroclada, also known as Holleton mallee, is a species of mallee that is endemic to the southwest of Western Australia. It has smooth bark, lance-shaped adult leaves, flower buds in pendent groups of nine to thirteen, pale lemon yellow flowers and barrel-shaped to cup-shaped fruit.

== Description ==
Eucalyptus terphroclada is a mallee that typically grows to a height of 4–5 m (13–16 ft) and forms a lignotuber. It has smooth, reddish, brownish and grey bark and branchlets covered with white, powdery granules. Young plants and coppice regrowth have elliptical to lance-shaped leaves that are 30–90 mm (1.2–3.5 in) long, 15–35 mm (0.59–1.38 in) wide and petiolate. Adult leaves are the same shade of glossy green on both sides, lance-shaped, 50–100 mm (2.0–3.9 in) long and 9–15 mm (0.35–0.59 in) wide on a petiole 7–20 mm (0.28–0.79 in) long. The flowers buds are arranged in leaf axils in groups of nine to thirteen on a pendulous, thin, flattened, unbranched peduncle 12–40 mm (0.47–1.57 in) long, the individual buds on pedicels 5–11 mm (0.20–0.43 in) long. Mature buds are 24–32 mm (0.94–1.26 in) long and 5–8 mm (0.20–0.31 in) wide with a horn-shaped operculum up to four times as long as the floral cup. Flowering occurs from October to February and the flowers are pale lemony yellow. The fruit is a woody barrel-shaped to cup-shaped capsule 8–14 mm (0.31–0.55 in) long and 6–10 mm (0.24–0.39 in) wide with the valves near rim level.

== Taxonomy and naming ==
Eucalyptus tephroclada was first formally described in 1992 by Lawrie Johnson and Ken Hill in the journal Telopea from specimens collected near Bruce Rock in 1986. The specific epithet (tephroclada) is from ancient Greek words meaning "ash-grey" and "twig", referring to the powdery covering on the twigs.

== Distribution and habitat ==
This mallee grows in woodland with scattered mallee scrubs in scattered places between Quairading, Southern Cross, Kukerin and Hyden.

== Conservation status ==
This eucalypt is classified as "not threatened" by the Western Australian Government Department of Parks and Wildlife.

== See also ==
- List of Eucalyptus species
