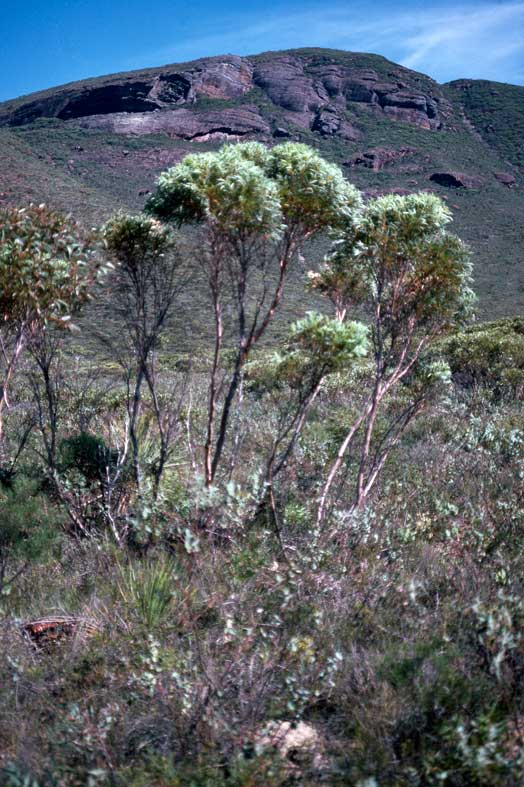
- Eucalyptus buprestium in the Stirling Range

Conservation status
- Vulnerable (IUCN 3.1)

Scientific classification
- Kingdom: Plantae
- Clade: Tracheophytes
- Clade: Angiosperms
- Clade: Eudicots
- Clade: Rosids
- Order: Myrtales
- Family: Myrtaceae
- Genus: Eucalyptus
- Species: E. buprestium

Binomial name
- Eucalyptus buprestium F.Muell.

= Eucalyptus buprestium =

Apple mallee

Species of eucalyptus

Eucalyptus buprestium, also known as the apple mallee or ball-fruited mallee, is a small mallee that is endemic to an area along the south coast of Western Australia. It has smooth bark, narrow lance-shaped adult leaves, flower buds arranged in groups of between nine and fifteen, white flowers and almost spherical fruit with a small opening.

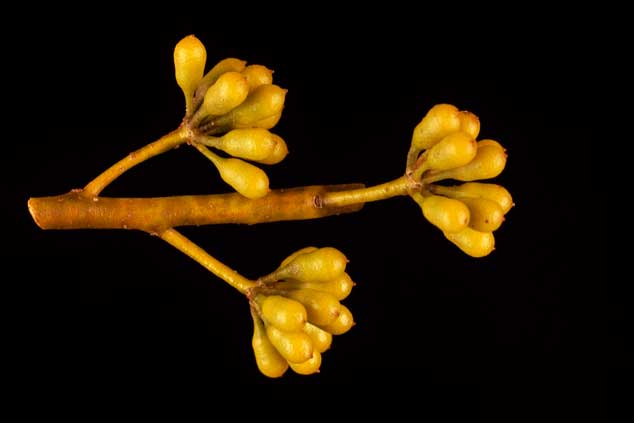
Flower buds

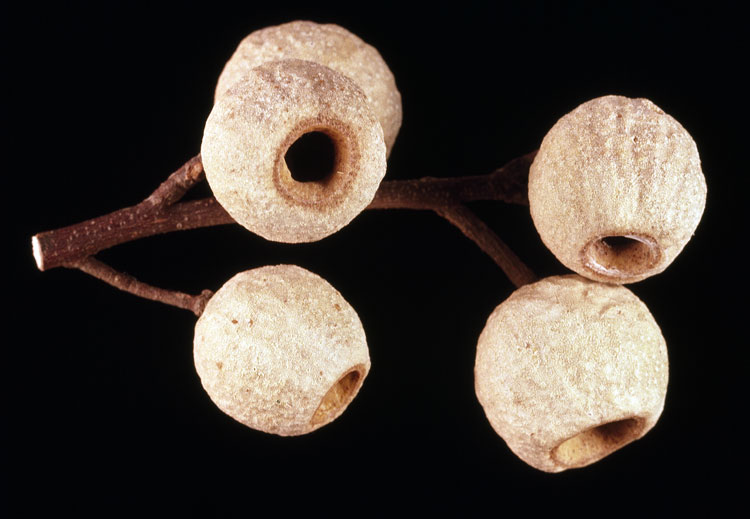
Fruit

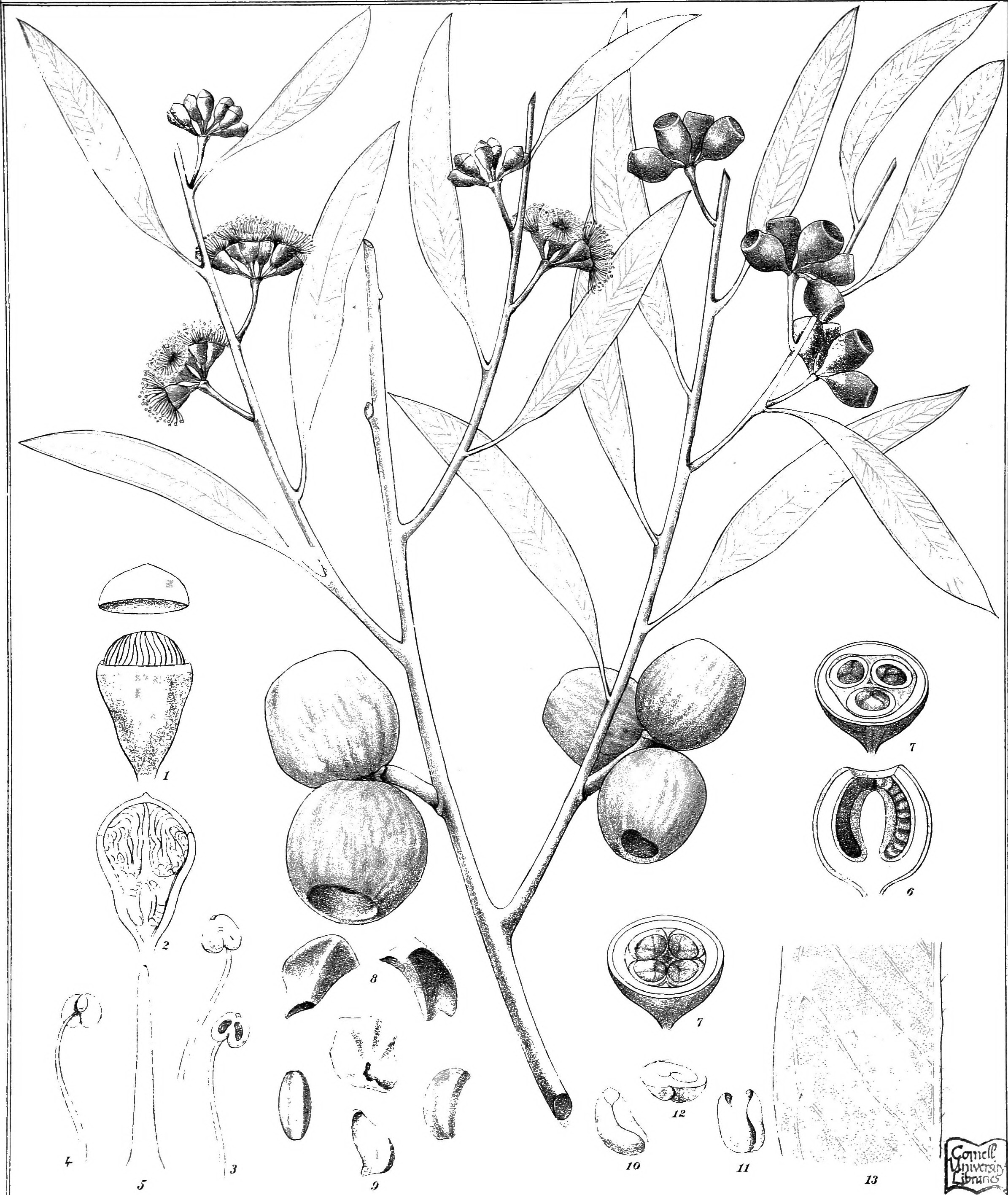
Eucalyptus buprestium from Eucalyptographia

== Description ==
Eucalyptus buprestium is a mallee that typically grows to a height of 1 to 6 metres (3 to 20 ft) and forms a lignotuber. It has smooth greenish brown and cream-coloured bark that ages to grey and is shed in ribbons. Young plants have dull green, elliptic, sessile leaves arranged in opposite pairs, 45–70 mm (2–3 in) long and 15–20 mm (0.6–0.8 in) wide. Adult leaves are arranged alternately, greyish green, narrow lance-shaped, 30–77 mm (1–3 in) long and 6–10 mm (0.2–0.4 in) wide on a petiole 4–10 mm (0.2–0.4 in) long. The flower buds are arranged in groups of between nine and fifteen on a peduncle 10–20 mm (0.4–0.8 in) long, the individual flowers on a pedicel 2–5 mm (0.08–0.2 in) long. The mature buds are oval to pear-shaped, 5–6 mm (0.20–0.24 in) long and 3–5 mm (0.12–0.20 in) wide with a rounded operculum sometimes with a small point on the end. Flowering occurs from September to December, sometimes as late as April and the flowers are white. November and April producing white flowers. The fruit is a woody, almost spherical capsule 18–25 mm (0.71–0.98 in) long and 20–30 mm (0.79–1.2 in) wide, with a small opening enclosing the valves.

== Taxonomy ==
Eucalyptus buprestium was first formally described by the botanist Ferdinand von Mueller in 1862 and the description was published in his book Fragmenta phytographiae Australiae. The specific epithet (buprestium) alludes to the beetle genus Bupestris, "referring to the attraction the mallees had for some beetles".

The species is part of the Eucalyptus subgenus series Diversiformae, a group of mallees that all have adult leaves held erect, buds with a single unscarred operculum and pyramidal seeds. The other species in this series include E. erectifolia, E. platydisca, E.diversifolia, E. todtiana, E. lateritica, E. dolorosa and E. pachyloma.

== Distribution ==
Apple mallee is found on coastal and near-coastal sandplains and ridge tops along the south coast in the Great Southern region of Western Australia between Albany in the west, Mount Barker in the north and Jerramungup in the east where it grows in gravelly sandy-clay soils.

== See also ==
- List of Eucalyptus species
