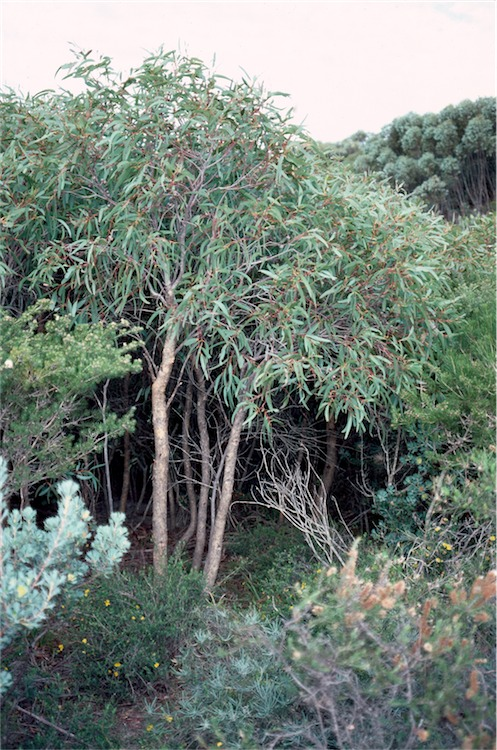
- Eucalyptus lateritica growing near Badgingarra

Conservation status
- Data Deficient (IUCN 3.1)

- Vulnerable (EPBC Act)

Scientific classification
- Kingdom: Plantae
- Clade: Tracheophytes
- Clade: Angiosperms
- Clade: Eudicots
- Clade: Rosids
- Order: Myrtales
- Family: Myrtaceae
- Genus: Eucalyptus
- Species: E. lateritica

Binomial name
- Eucalyptus lateritica Brooker & Hopper

= Eucalyptus lateritica =

Laterite mallee

Eucalyptus mallee native to Western Australia

Eucalyptus lateritica, commonly known as laterite mallee, is a species of mallee that is endemic to a small area in the south-west of Western Australia. It has rough bark on the lower half of the trunk, smooth grey bark above, lance-shaped adult leaves, flower buds in groups of nine or eleven, white flowers and shortened spherical fruit.

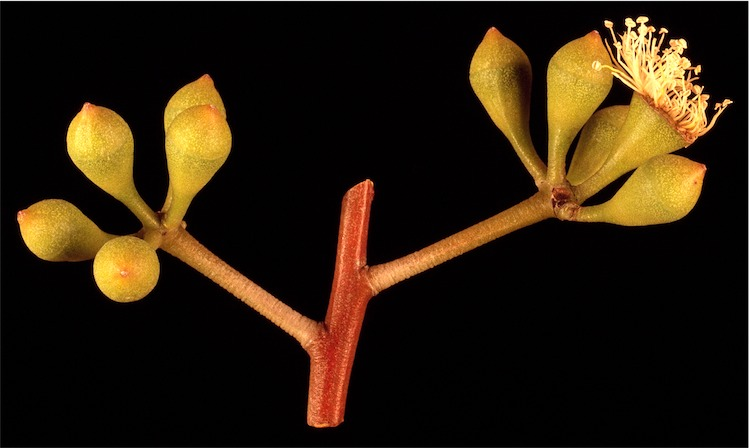
Flower buds

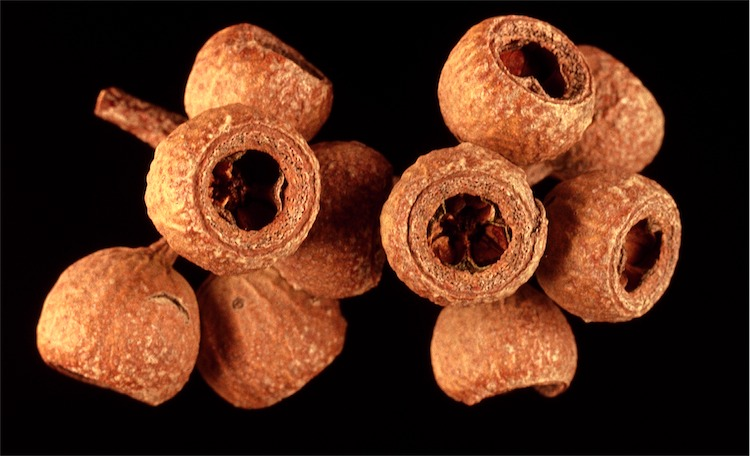
Fruit

== Description ==
Eucalyptus lateritica is a mallee that typically grows to a height of 2–4 m (6 ft 7 in – 13 ft 1 in) and forms a lignotuber. It has smooth greyish brown bark, usually with rough, corky bark on the lower half of the trunk. Young plants and coppice regrowth have elliptic to lance-shaped leaves that are 70–180 mm (2.8–7.1 in) long, 10–35 mm (0.39–1.38 in) wide and have a petiole. Adult leaves are the same slightly glossy green on both sides, lance-shaped, 70–125 mm (2.8–4.9 in) long and 9–20 mm (0.35–0.79 in) wide on a petiole 10–18 mm (0.39–0.71 in) long. The flower buds are arranged in leaf axils in groups of nine or eleven on an unbranched peduncle 8–20 mm (0.31–0.79 in) long, the individual buds on pedicels 1–7 mm (0.039–0.276 in) long. Mature buds are oval to broadly spindle-shaped, 7–10 mm (0.28–0.39 in) long and 5–7 mm (0.20–0.28 in) wide with a conical operculum. Flowering occurs between August and October and the flowers are white. The fruit is a woody, shortened spherical capsule 10–13 mm (0.39–0.51 in) long and 12–16 mm (0.47–0.63 in) wide with the valves at or below the level of the rim.

== Taxonomy and naming ==
Eucalyptus lateritica was first formally described in 1986 by the botanists Ian Brooker and Stephen Hopper from a specimen collected by Hopper near Mount Lesueur and the description was published in the journal Nuytsia. The specific epithet (lateritica) is derived from the Latin word lateritius meaning "brick-red", referring to the lateritic gravel which dominated the area where this species grows.

The species is part of the subgenus Eucalyptus series Diversiformae, a group of mallee species that all have adult leaves held erect, buds with a single unscarred operculum and pyramidal seeds. The other species in this series include E. erectifolia, E. platydisca, E. diversifolia, E. todtiana, E. pachyloma, E. dolorosa and E. buprestium.

== Distribution and habitat ==
Laterite mallee is found on breakaways and mesas in the Badgingarra - Mount Lesueur area where it grows in sandy-gravelly lateritic soils.

== Conservation status ==
This mallee is listed as "vulnerable" under the Australian Government Environment Protection and Biodiversity Conservation Act 1999 and as "Threatened Flora (Declared Rare Flora — Extant)" by the Department of Environment and Conservation (Western Australia). The main potential threats to the species include susceptibility to disease caused by Phytophthora cinnamomi, fire, insect damage, grazing, weeds and mining activities.

== See also ==
- List of Eucalyptus species
