= Ptilotus beckerianus =

Scientific classification
- Kingdom: Plantae
- Clade: Embryophytes
- Clade: Tracheophytes
- Clade: Spermatophytes
- Clade: Angiosperms
- Clade: Eudicots
- Order: Caryophyllales
- Family: Amaranthaceae
- Genus: Ptilotus
- Species: P. beckerianus

Binomial name
- Ptilotus beckerianus (F.Muell.) F.Muell. ex J.M.Black

Synonyms
- Ptilotus beckeranus Jessop orth. var.; Ptilotus beckeri F.Muell. nom. inval., nom. nud.; Trichinium beckerianum F.Muell.

Species of grass-like plant

Ptilotus beckerianus, commonly known as ironstone mulla mulla, is a species of flowering plant in the family Amaranthaceae and is endemic to the south of South Australia. It is an erect perennial herb, with spoon-shaped to egg-shaped or narrowly elliptic leaves, and spikes of white flowers sometimes tinged with pink.

== Description ==
Ptilotus beckerianus is an erect perennial herb that typically grows up to 20 cm (7.9 in) high, its stems and leaves glabrous. The leaves are spoon-shaped to egg-shaped or narrowly elliptic, the leaves at the base of the plant up to 50 mm (2.0 in) long and 10 mm (0.39 in) wide, the leaves on the stems up to 32 mm (1.3 in) long and 7 mm (0.28 in) wide. The flowers are borne in spikes up to 90 mm (3.5 in) long with about 60 white flowers sometimes tinged with pink. Flowering occurs between September and January and the fruit is papery and hairy, borne in cylindrical heads, each fruit containing a kidney-shaped, orange-brown seed.

== Taxonomy ==
This species was first formally described in 1853 by Ferdinand von Mueller who gave it the name Trichinium beckerianum in the journal Linnaea from specimens collected near Port Lincoln by Johann Friedrich Carl Wilhelmi. In 1948, John McConnell Black transferred the species to Ptilotus as P. beckerianus. The specific epithet (beckerianus) honours Ludwig Becker who illustrated plants for von Mueller.

== Distribution and habitat ==
Ptilotus beckerianus grows in open shrubland on sand, laterite or ironstone gravel with Eucalyptus diversifolia on the southern Eyre Peninsula and on Kangaroo Island.

== Conservation status ==
Ironstone mulla mulla is listed as "vulnerable".

== See also ==
- List of Ptilotus species
