= Emil Todt =

German painter

Emil Hermann Todt (born 1810 or 1811; died 10 July 1900) was a German botanical artist and sculptor who was active in Australia from the 1850s to the 1880s.

Todt was born in Berlin in 1810 or 1811, and studied sculpture under Ludwig Wilhelm Wichmann from around 1830 until 1836. In 1849 he emigrated to South Australia, possibly because of an involvement in the revolutions of the time. In 1851 he got caught up in the Victorian gold rush, but by 1854 had settled in Melbourne where he returned to sculpture.

That year he exhibited what has become his most famous work. This was The Gold Diggers, a sculpture depicting two gold diggers, one standing and one sitting, in their working clothes. Described at the time as "nothing short of genius of a high order", it is now held by the National Gallery of Victoria, and has recently been described in the following terms:

The sculpture possesses a resonance and monumentality beyond its diminutive size, and stands as one of the masterpieces of nineteenth-century Australian sculpture.

The Gold Diggers was exhibited at the Victorian Exhibition, attracting for Todt a number of commissions, including a Madonna and Child for the Roman Catholic Cathedral in Melbourne. By 1856 Todt was considered one of the leading artists in Melbourne, although this mantle was shortly afterwards claimed by Charles Summers.

During the 1860s, Todt made coloured, life-sized fruits and vegetables for display at the International Exhibitions at London in 1862 and at Dublin in 1865. He also created relief maps of Victoria and painted a portrait of premier of Victoria Richard Heales.

Todt undertook his last major work in the early 1880s. This was the illustration of Ferdinand von Mueller's Eucalyptographia: A Descriptive Atlas of the Eucalypts of Australia and the Adjoining Islands. In 1882, during the preparation of the work, von Mueller named Eucalyptus todtiana (coastal blackbutt) in honour of Todt, stating:

... this species bears the name of Mr Emil Todt, whose artistic talent became devoted only to illustrating plants at a venerable age, when most of those engaged in such pursuits, have ceased to work professionally. Therefore all the more praise is due to this gentleman for the youthful ardour, which he still brought to bear on the extensive furtherance of the present publication.

Two years later, the work was published, with Todt's contribution being over seventy lithographed illustrations.

He died in Melbourne on 10 July 1900.

== See also ==
- List of Australian botanical illustrators
