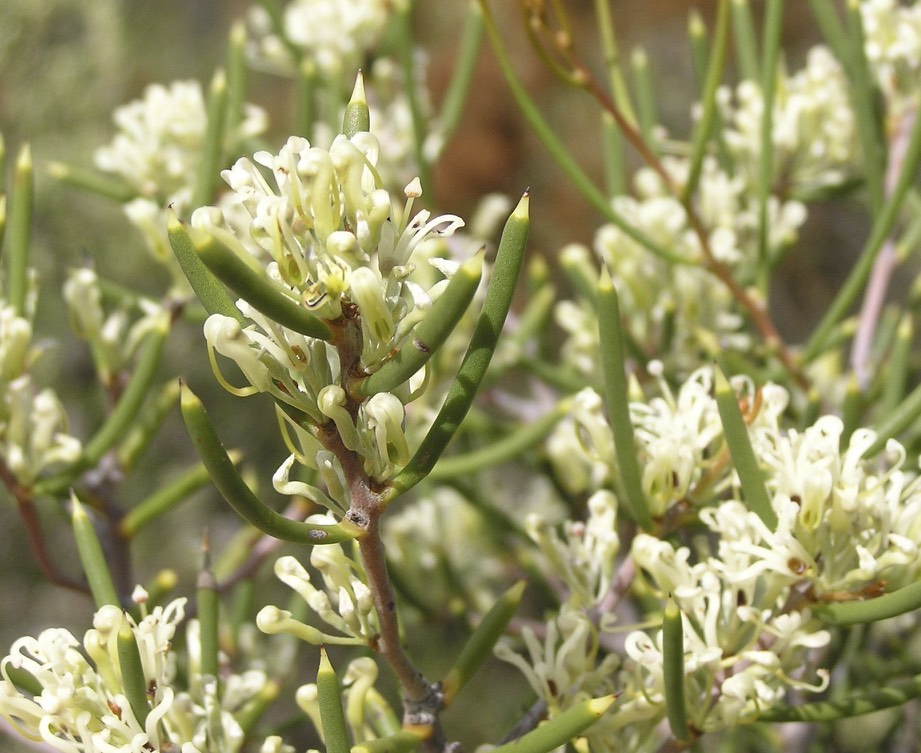
- Hakea obliqua growing near Lake Monginup

Scientific classification
- Kingdom: Plantae
- Clade: Tracheophytes
- Clade: Angiosperms
- Clade: Eudicots
- Order: Proteales
- Family: Proteaceae
- Genus: Hakea
- Species: H. obliqua

Binomial name
- Hakea obliqua R.Br.
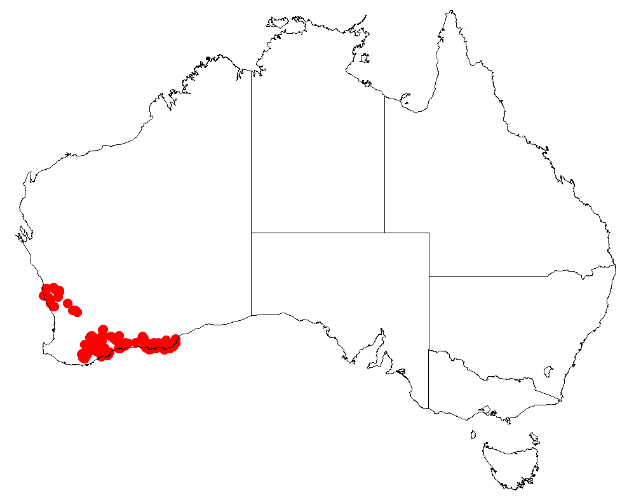
- Occurrence data from AVH

= Hakea obliqua =

Needles and corks

Species of shrub endemic to Western Australia

Hakea obliqua, commonly known as needles and corks, is a shrub in the family Proteaceae

== Description ==
Hakea obliqua is an erect, dense shrub typically growing to a height of 0.5 to 3 metres (1.6 to 9.8 ft) and does not form a lignotuber. The branchlets and new growth are rusty coloured. The leaves are needle-shaped, rigid, thick and 1–7 cm (0.39–2.76 in) long, 1.1–2.5 mm (0.043–0.098 in) wide ending in a sharp, erect point. The inflorescence consist of 2-8 white-cream-yellow flowers sometimes with a greenish tinge on a stem 1.3–5 mm (0.051–0.197 in) long. The strongly scented flowers are in clusters in the leaf axils. he pedicels re 3.5–6 mm (0.14–0.24 in) long and densely covered with flattened silky white hairs that extend onto the 4.5–7.5 mm (0.18–0.30 in) long perianth. The pistil is 5.5–10 mm (0.22–0.39 in) long. The large rounded fruit are 2–4.5 cm (0.8–2 in) long and 2–4.5 cm (0.8–2 in) wide. The young fruit are smooth and as they age, the surface becomes covered in thick angular cork outgrowths. The fruit taper at the apex with either a curved or straight point 1–6 mm (0.039–0.236 in) long. Flowering occurs from May to October.

== Taxonomy and naming ==
This species was first described by Robert Brown in 1810 and published the description in Transactions of the Linnean Society London. The specific epithet obliqua is derived from the Latin obliquus 'oblique', referring to the nectar gland which is on a slant from the flower axis.

== Distribution and habitat ==
Hakea obliqua is found in southern Western Australia from the Stirling Range to Albany area to Israelite Bay and inland to Pingrup. It grows in heath and scrubland on sand and sandy loam.

== Conservation status ==
Hake obliqua is classified as "not threatened" by the Western Australian Government.
