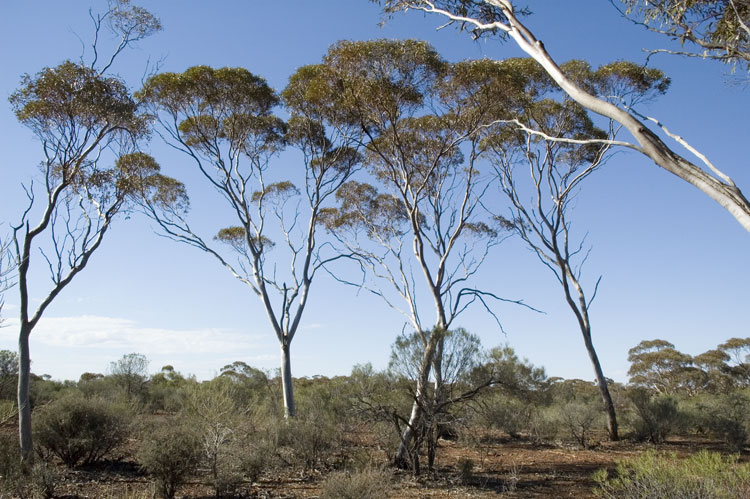
- Eucalyptus griffithsii in the Karlkurla Bushland Park, Kalgoorlie

Scientific classification
- Kingdom: Plantae
- Clade: Embryophytes
- Clade: Tracheophytes
- Clade: Spermatophytes
- Clade: Angiosperms
- Clade: Eudicots
- Clade: Rosids
- Order: Myrtales
- Family: Myrtaceae
- Genus: Eucalyptus
- Species: E. griffithsii

Binomial name
- Eucalyptus griffithsii Maiden

= Eucalyptus griffithsii =

Griffith's grey gum

Species of eucalyptus

Eucalyptus griffithsii, commonly known as Griffith's grey gum, is a species of mallee or tree that is endemic to Western Australia. It has smooth grey to whitish bark, sometimes with rough, loose fibrous bark near the base of the trunk, lance-shaped adult leaves, flower buds in groups of three, white flowers and conical to cup-shaped fruit.

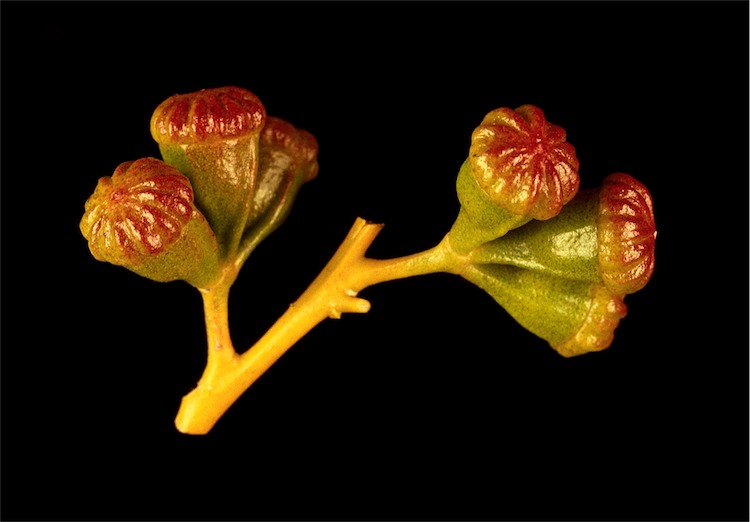
Flower buds

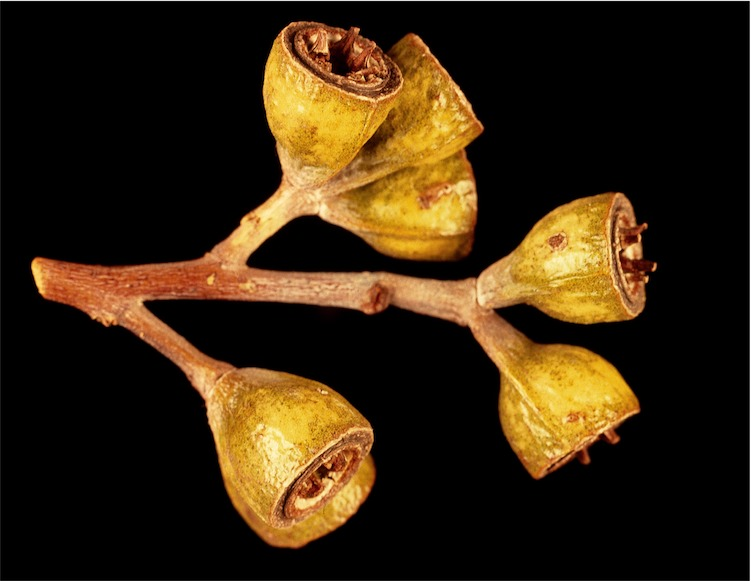
Fruit

== Description ==
Eucalyptus griffithsii is a mallee or tree that typically grows to a height of 3–10 m (9.8–32.8 ft) and forms a lignotuber. It has smooth grey to whitish bark, sometimes with rough, fibrous or scaly bark covering the bottom 1 to 3 m (3 to 10 ft). Young plants and coppice regrowth have elliptical to lance-shaped, greyish green to slightly glaucous leaves, 45–135 mm (1.8–5.3 in) long and 16–35 mm (0.63–1.38 in) wide. Adult leaves are usually lance-shaped, the same glossy green on both sides, 80–135 mm (3.1–5.3 in) long and 8–27 mm (0.31–1.06 in) wide on a petiole 15–30 mm (0.59–1.18 in) long. The flower buds are arranged in leaf axils in groups of three on an unbranched peduncle 5–15 mm (0.20–0.59 in) long, the individual buds on pedicels 3–10 mm (0.12–0.39 in) long. Mature buds are cylindrical to pear-shaped, 8–15 mm (0.31–0.59 in) long and 7–15 mm (0.28–0.59 in) wide with an operculum that has radiating striations and is wider than the floral cup. Flowering occurs between September and December or between January and March and the flowers are white. The fruit is a woody conical to cup-shaped capsule 8–16 mm (0.31–0.63 in) long and 10–15 mm (0.39–0.59 in) wide with two ridges along its sides and the valves near rim level.

== Taxonomy and naming ==
Eucalyptus griffithsii was first formally described in 1911 by Joseph Maiden in the Journal of the Natural History and Science Society of Western Australia. The specific epithet (griffithsii) honours John Moore Griffiths for his interest in the work of Maiden over "nearly thirty years".

== Distribution and habitat ==
Griffith's grey gum grows on low-lying flats and on rocky hillsides in the Goldfields-Esperance region of Western Australia between Kalgoorlie and Norseman where it grows in loamy-gravelly soils.

== Conservation status ==
This mallee is classified as "not threatened" by the Western Australian Government Department of Parks and Wildlife.

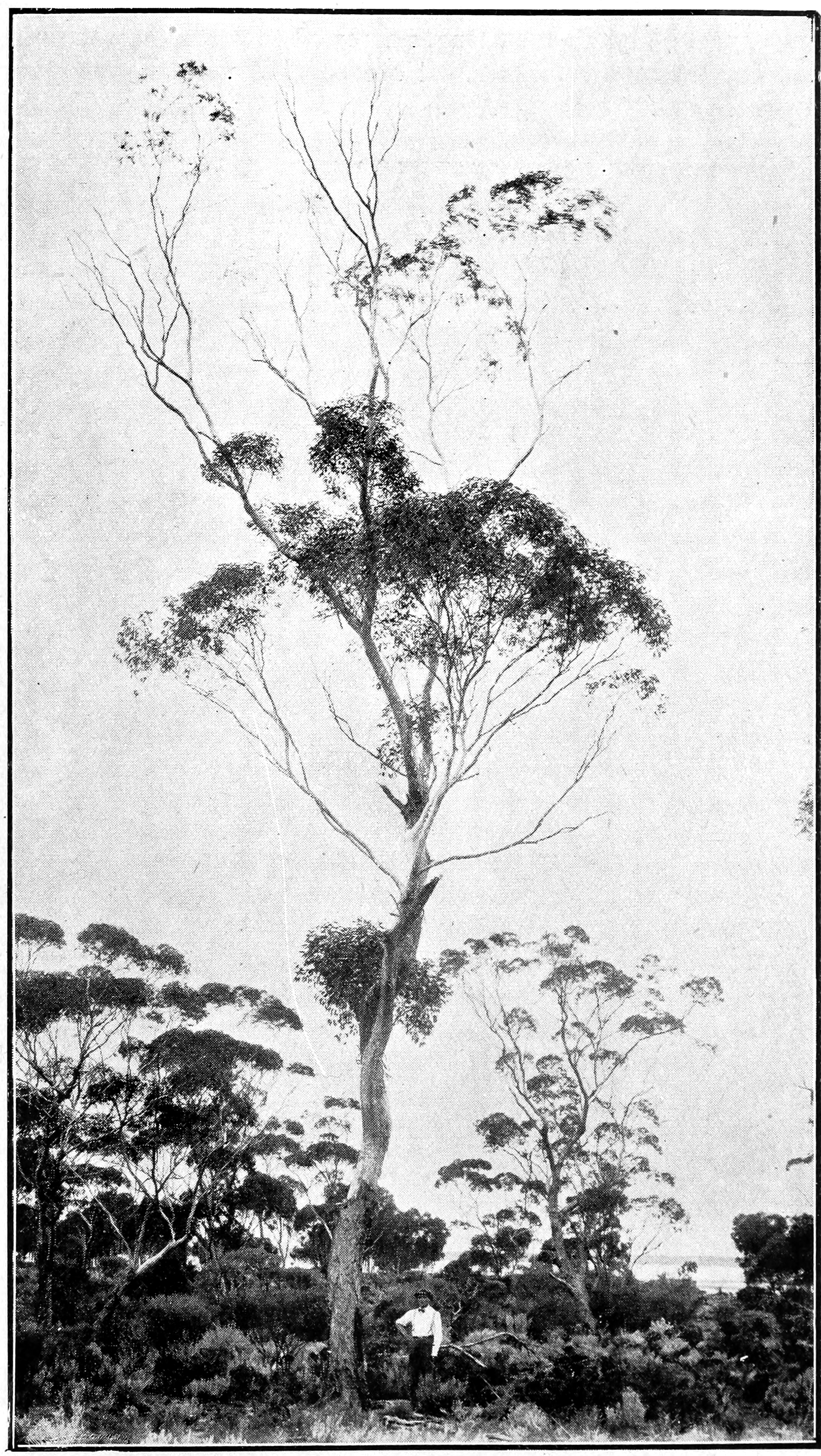
mature tree with man standing at left, circa 1920

== See also ==
- List of Eucalyptus species
