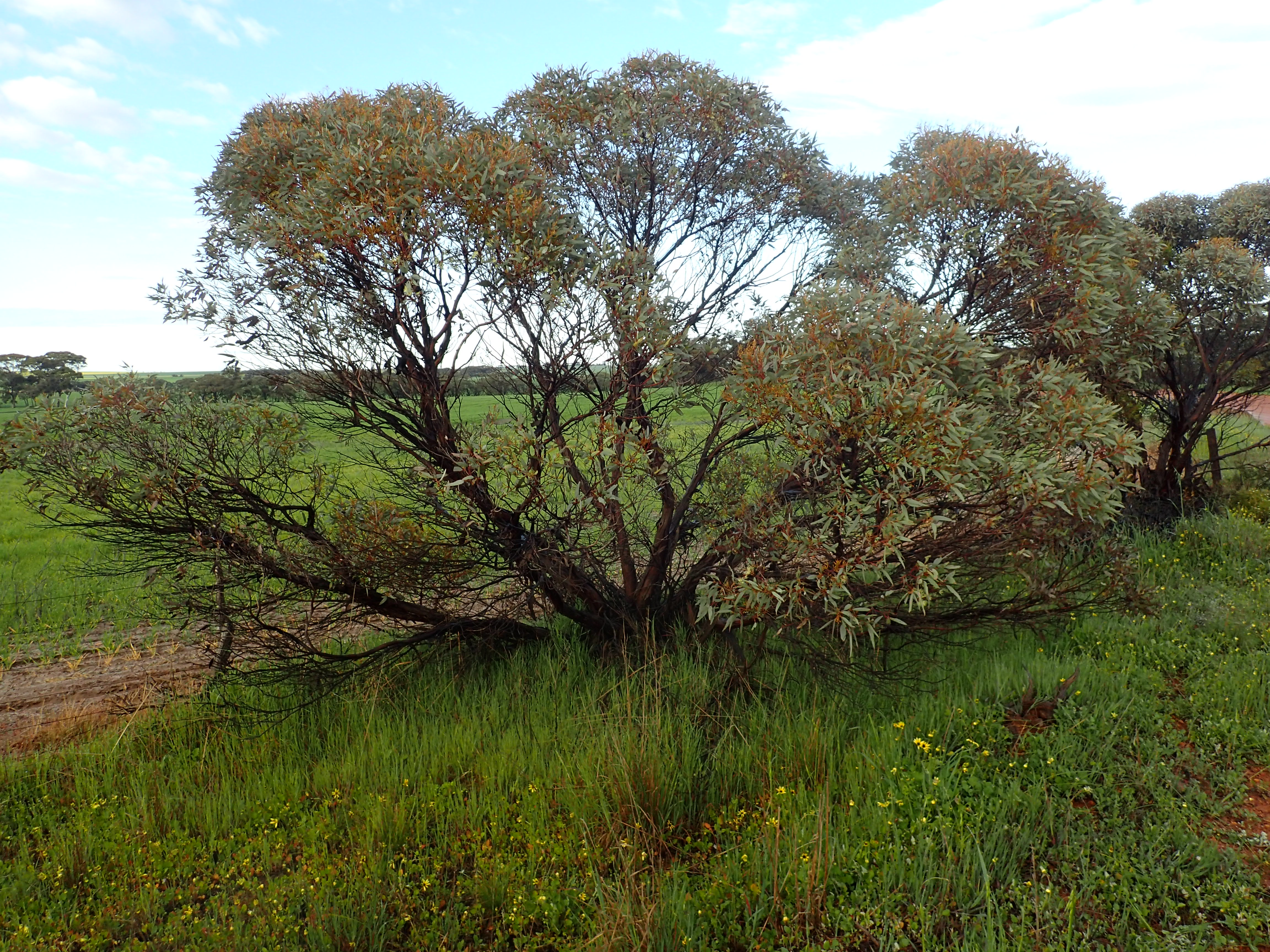
- Habit near Corrigin

Conservation status
- Vulnerable (IUCN 3.1)

Scientific classification
- Kingdom: Plantae
- Clade: Tracheophytes
- Clade: Angiosperms
- Clade: Eudicots
- Clade: Rosids
- Order: Myrtales
- Family: Myrtaceae
- Genus: Eucalyptus
- Species: E. pluricaulis

Binomial name
- Eucalyptus pluricaulis Brooker & Hopper

= Eucalyptus pluricaulis =

Purple-leaved mallee

Species of eucalyptus

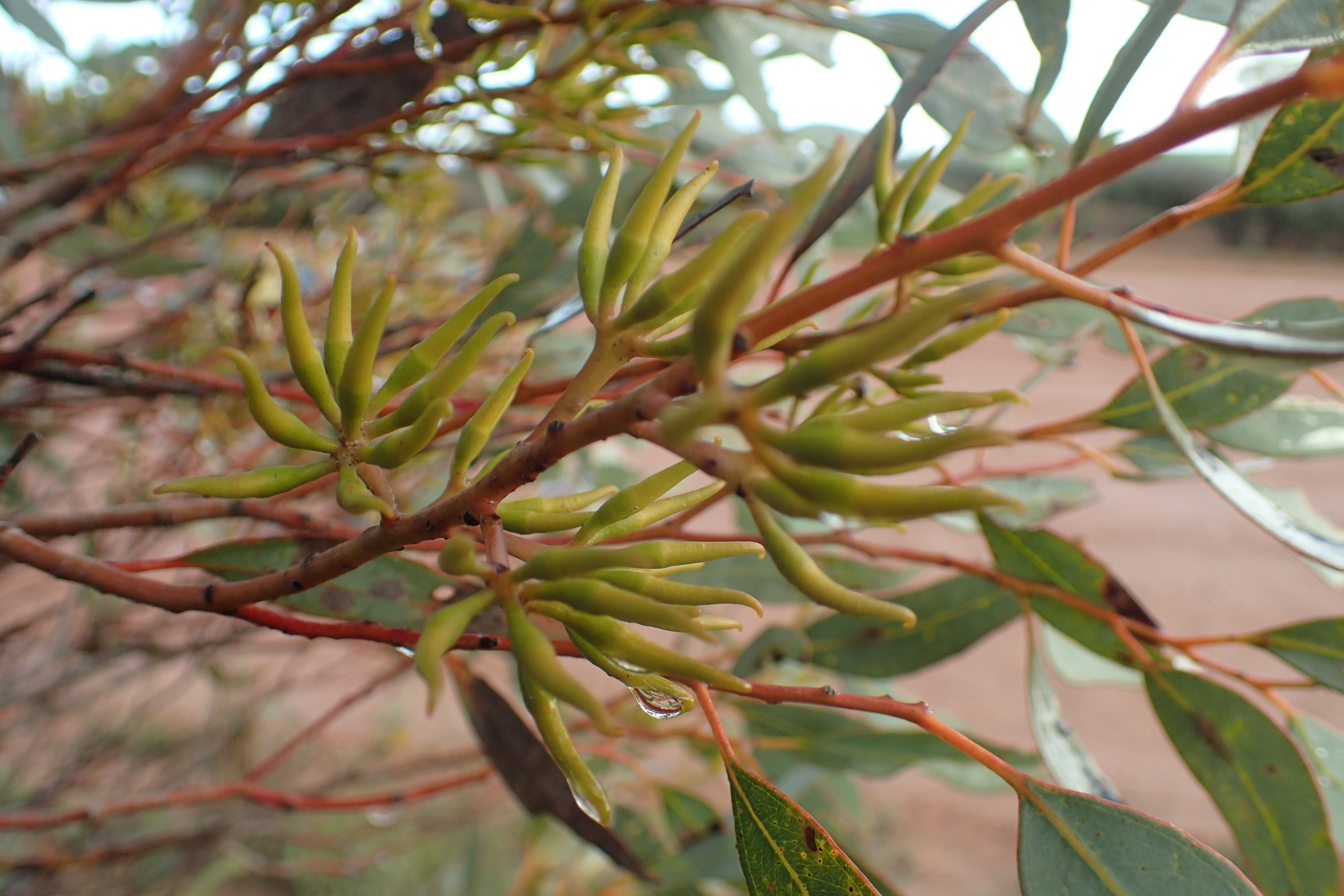
Flower buds

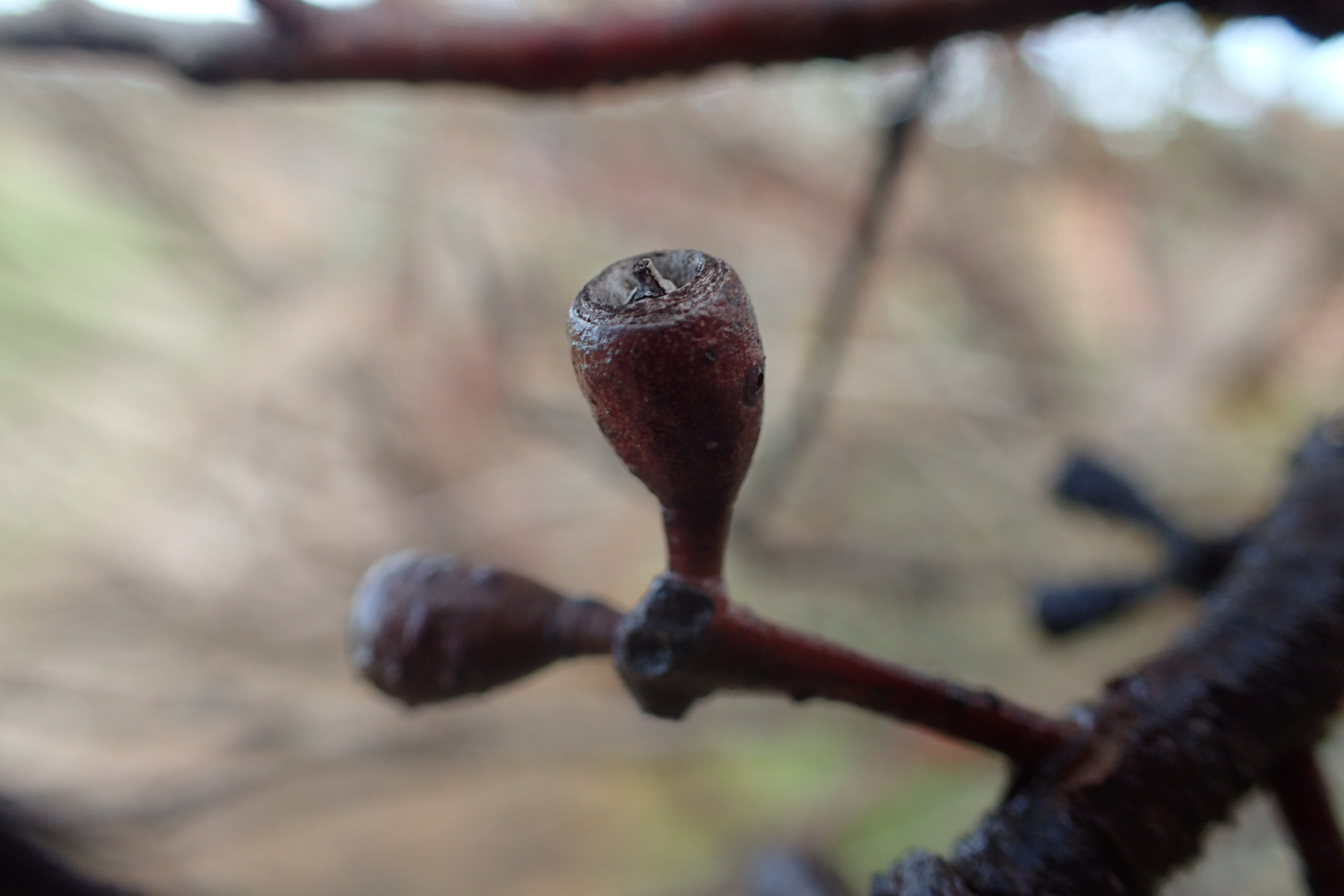
Flower buds

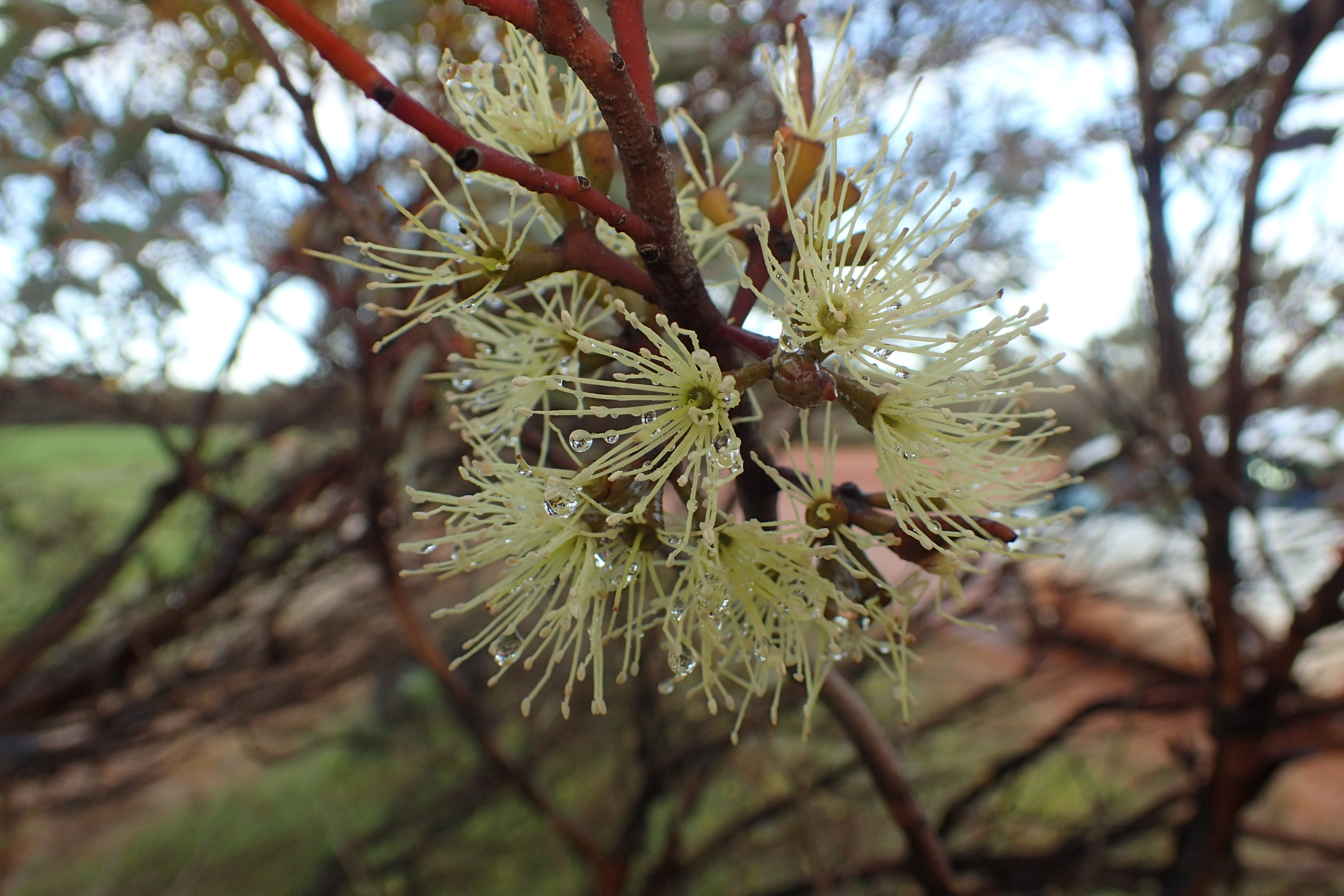
Flowers

Eucalyptus pluricaulis, commonly known as the purple-leaved mallee, is a species of mallee that is endemic to Western Australia. It has smooth bark, dull bluish green, lance-shaped leaves, flower buds in groups of between nine and fifteen, pale yellow flowers and cylindrical to barrel-shaped fruit.

== Description ==
Eucalyptus pluricaulis is a mallee that typically grows to a height of 1–5 m (3 ft 3 in – 16 ft 5 in) and forms a lignotuber. It has smooth, greyish bark that is copper-coloured when new. Adult leaves are the same shade of dull bluish green on both sides, 50–105 mm (2.0–4.1 in) long and 7–20 mm (0.28–0.79 in) wide tapering to a petiole 8–17 mm (0.31–0.67 in) long. The flower buds are arranged in leaf axils in groups of between nine and fifteen on an unbranched peduncle 8–17 mm (0.31–0.67 in) long, the individual buds on pedicels up to 6 mm (0.24 in) long. Mature buds are an elongated spindle shape, 17–28 mm (0.67–1.10 in) long and 3–5 mm (0.12–0.20 in) wide with a horn-shaped operculum that is three or four times as long as the floral cup. Flowering occurs from March to September and the flowers are pale yellow. The fruit is a woody, cylindrical to barrel-shaped capsule 7–11 mm (0.28–0.43 in) long and 5–7 mm (0.20–0.28 in) wide with the valves near rim level.

== Taxonomy ==
Eucalyptus pluricaulis was first formally described in 1991 by Ian Brooker and Stephen Hopper in the journal Nuytsia from specimens Brooker collected near the Coorow-Greenhead Road in 1982. The specific epithet (pluricaulis) is from the Latin plus, pluris meaning "more" or "several" and caulis meaning "stem", referring to the mallee habit of this eucalypt.

In the same journal, Brooker and Hopper described two subspecies and the names have been accepted by the Australian Plant Census:

- Eucalyptus pluricaulis Brooker & Hopper subsp. pluricaulis is an erect mallee with bluish green leaves and up to eleven buds in each group;
- Eucalyptus pluricaulis subsp. prophyrea Brooker & Hopper is a low, straggly mallee with purplish leaves and up to fifteen flowers in each group.

== Distribution and habitat ==
Subspecies pluricaulis grows in tall mallee, often on slopes near breakaways and is found from near Three Springs and the Lesueur National Park to Southern Cross and Ravensthorpe. Subspecies porphyrea grows in mallee between Tarin Rock, the Fitzgerald River National Park and the Stirling Range.

== Conservation status ==
Both subspecies of this mallee eucalypt are classified as "not threatened" by the Western Australian Government Department of Parks and Wildlife. The IUCN Red List assesses the species as Vulnerable.

== See also ==
- List of Eucalyptus species
