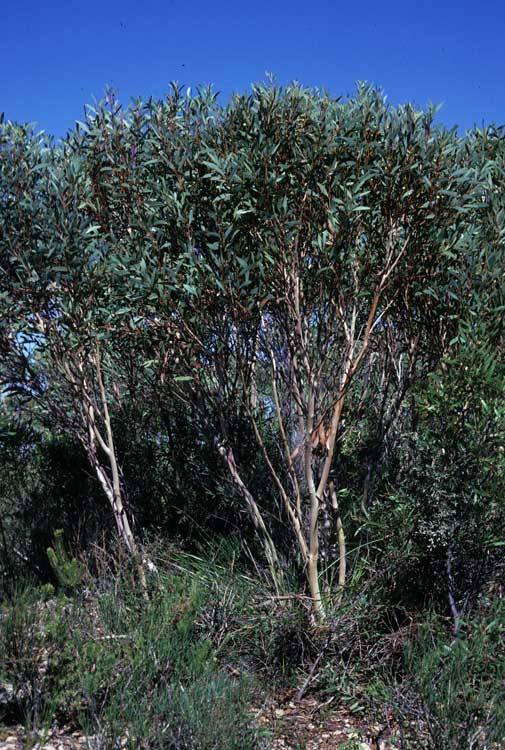
- In the Stirling Range

Conservation status
- Endangered (IUCN 3.1)

- Priority Four — Rare Taxa (DEC)

Scientific classification
- Kingdom: Plantae
- Clade: Tracheophytes
- Clade: Angiosperms
- Clade: Eudicots
- Clade: Rosids
- Order: Myrtales
- Family: Myrtaceae
- Genus: Eucalyptus
- Species: E. erectifolia

Binomial name
- Eucalyptus erectifolia Brooker & Hopper

= Eucalyptus erectifolia =

Stirling Range mallee

Species of eucalyptus endemic to Western Australia

Eucalyptus erectifolia, commonly known as Stirling Range mallee, is a species of mallee that is endemic to Western Australia. It has smooth bark, narrow lance-shaped adult leaves, flower buds in groups of between seven and thirteen, white flowers and cup-shaped fruit.

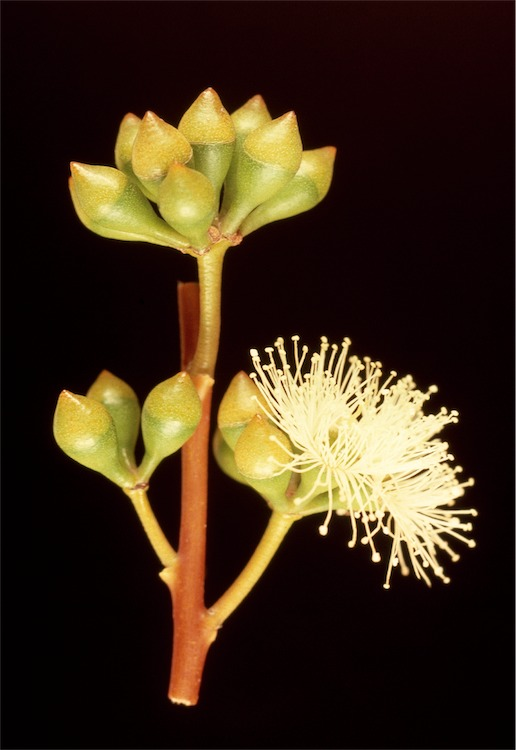
Flower buds

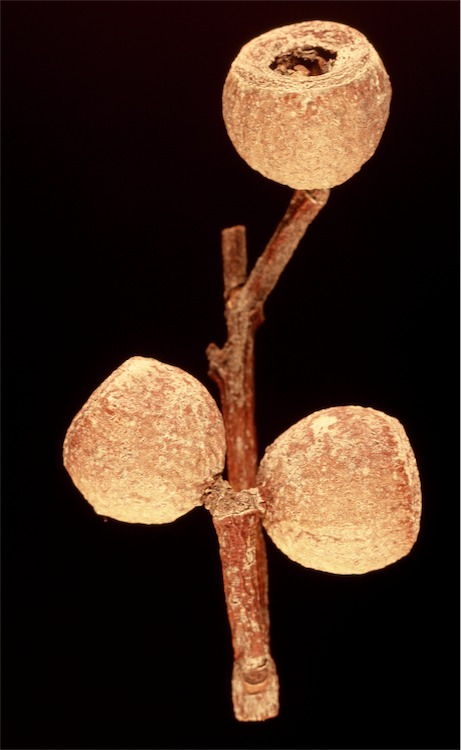
Fruit

== Description ==
Eucalyptus erectifolia is a mallee that typically grows to a height of 1–5 m (3 ft 3 in – 16 ft 5 in), has smooth grey bark and forms a lignotuber. Young plants and coppice regrowth have sessile, egg-shaped to elliptical leaves 50–120 mm (2.0–4.7 in) long, 10–25 mm (0.39–0.98 in) wide and arranged in opposite pairs. Adult leaves are arranged alternately, narrow lance-shaped, 55–105 mm (2.2–4.1 in) long, 7–15 mm (0.28–0.59 in) wide on a petiole 5–10 mm (0.20–0.39 in) long. The flower buds are arranged in leaf axils in groups of between seven and thirteen on an unbranched peduncle 10–25 mm (0.39–0.98 in) long, the individual buds on a pedicel 1–4 mm (0.039–0.157 in) long. Mature buds are oval to spindle-shaped, 7–11 mm (0.28–0.43 in) long, 4–6 mm (0.16–0.24 in) wide with a conical operculum. Flowering occurs between March and May and the flowers are white. The fruit is a woody, broadly cup-shaped capsule 11–14 mm (0.43–0.55 in) long, 14–18 mm (0.55–0.71 in) wide with the valves near the level of the rim.

== Taxonomy and naming ==
Eucalyptus erectifolia was first formally described in 1986 by Ian Brooker and Stephen Hopper from a specimen collected in the Stirling Range in 1981. The description was published in the journal Nuytsia. The specific epithet (erectifolia) is derived from the Latin "erectus" and -folia meaning "leaved" referring to the way the leaves are held in the crown.

This species is part of the subgenus Eucalyptus series Diversiformae, a group of mallees that all have adult leaves held erect, buds with a single unscarred operculum and pyramidal seeds.

== Distribution and habitat ==
Stirling Range mallee grows in sandy-loamy-gravelly soils in open shrubland on hillslopes and sandplains in the Stirling Range.

== Conservation status ==
Eucalyptus erectifolia is classified as "Priority Four" by the Government of Western Australia Department of Parks and Wildlife, meaning that is rare or near threatened. The IUCN Red List assesses the species as endangered.

== See also ==
- List of Eucalyptus species
