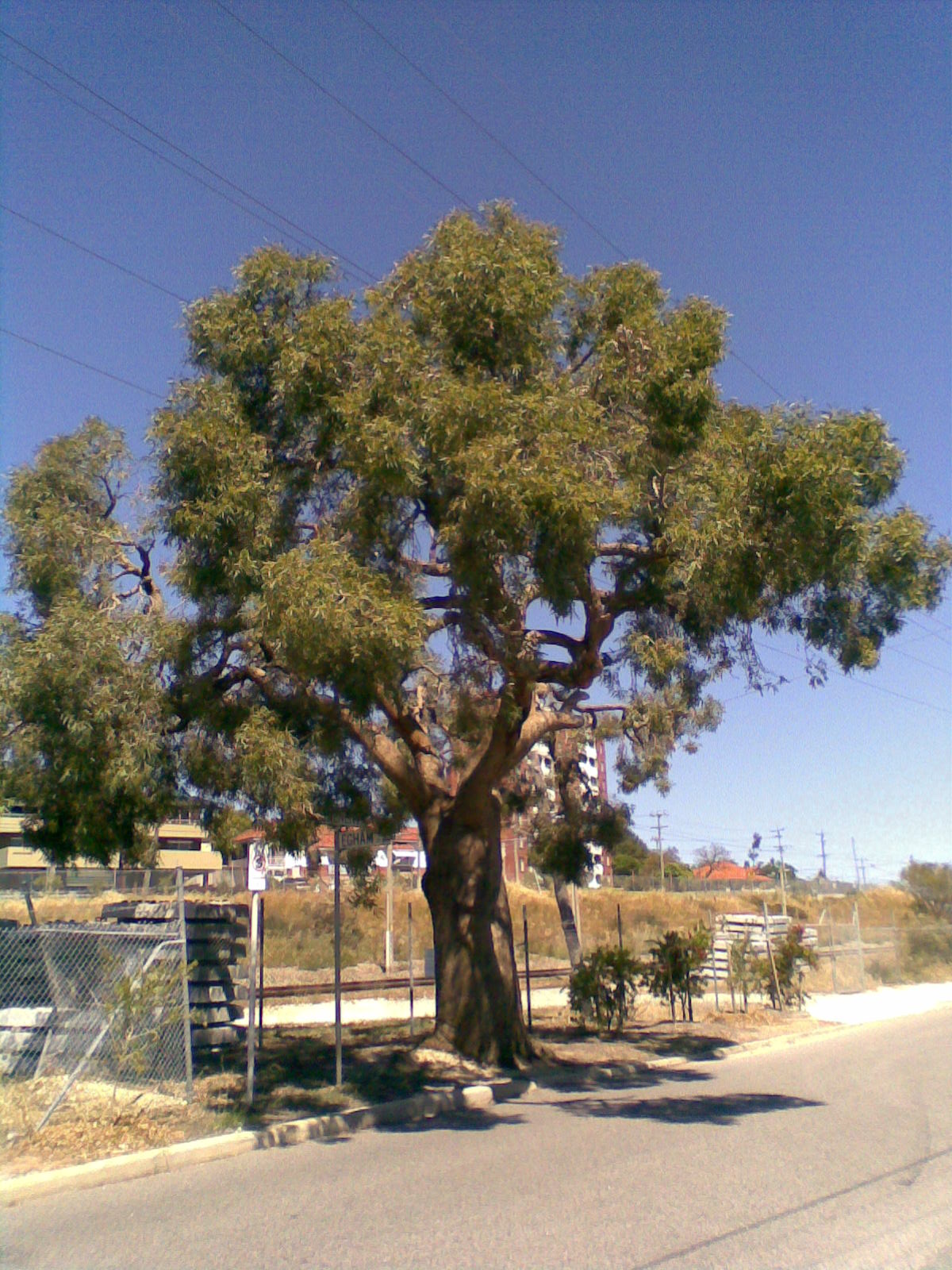
- A remnant coastal blackbutt in Victoria Park, Western Australia

Scientific classification
- Kingdom: Plantae
- Clade: Embryophytes
- Clade: Tracheophytes
- Clade: Spermatophytes
- Clade: Angiosperms
- Clade: Eudicots
- Clade: Rosids
- Order: Myrtales
- Family: Myrtaceae
- Genus: Eucalyptus
- Species: E. todtiana

Binomial name
- Eucalyptus todtiana F.Muell.

= Eucalyptus todtiana =

Coastal blackbutt

Species of eucalyptus

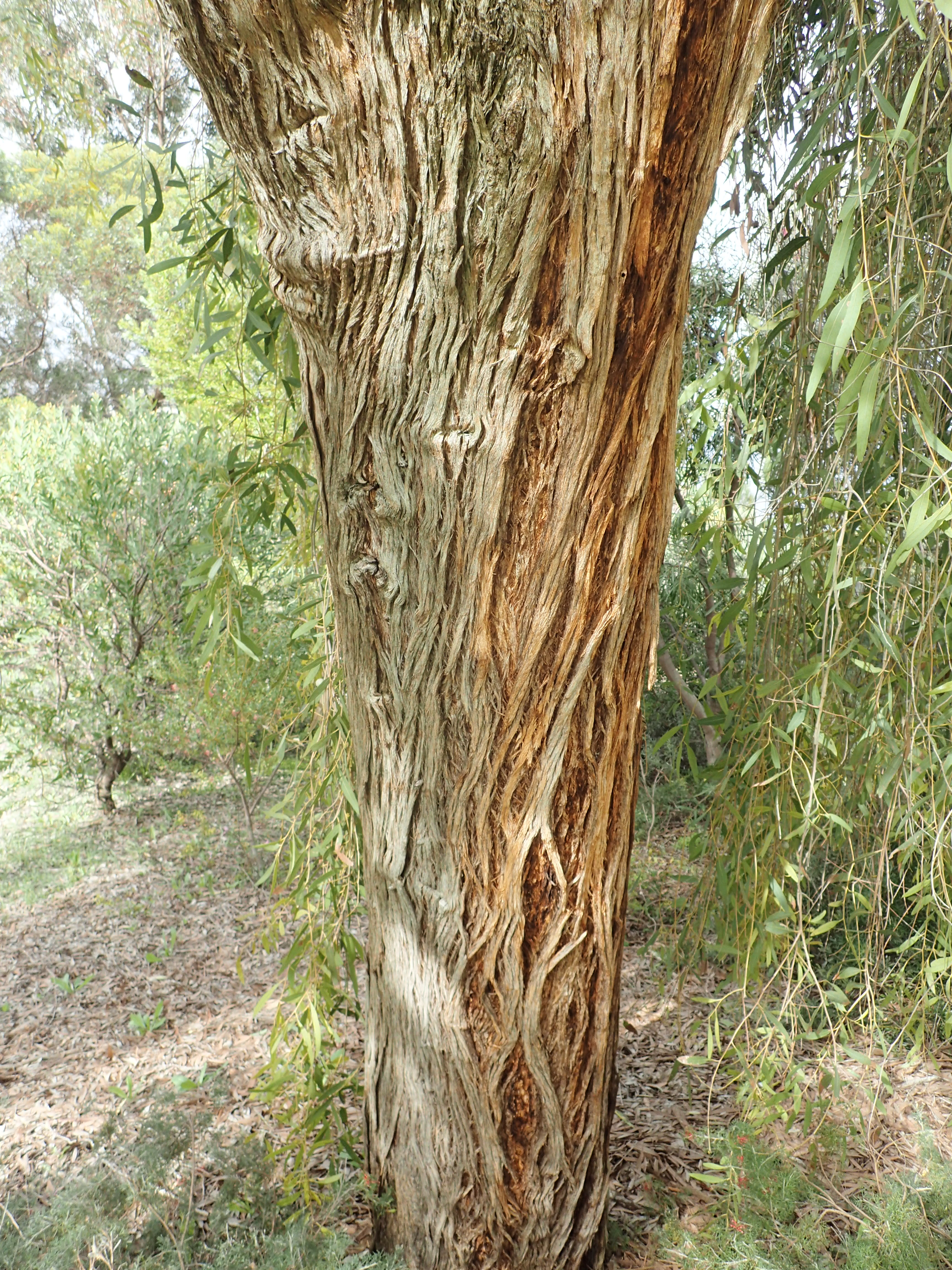
Bark

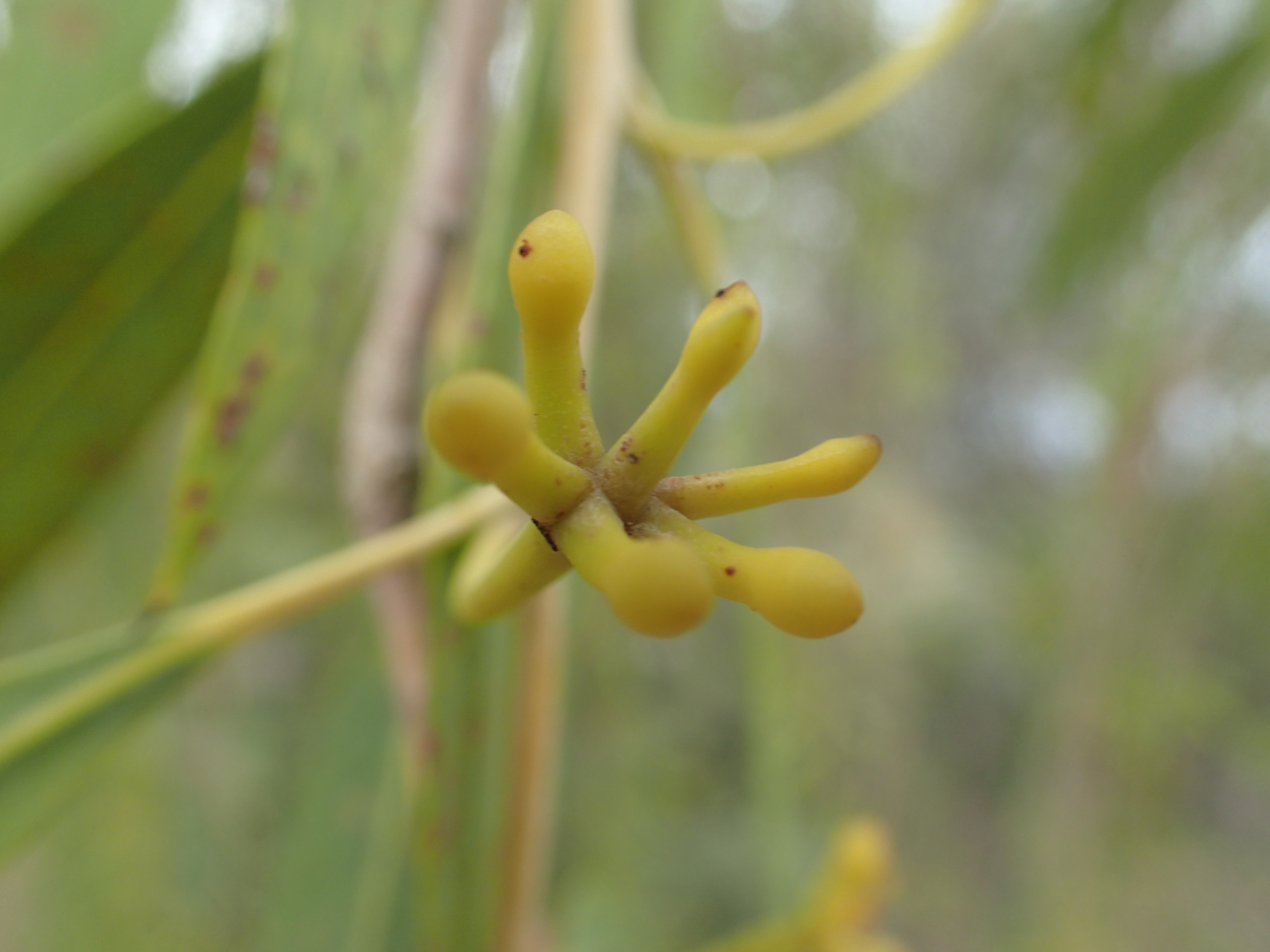
Flower buds

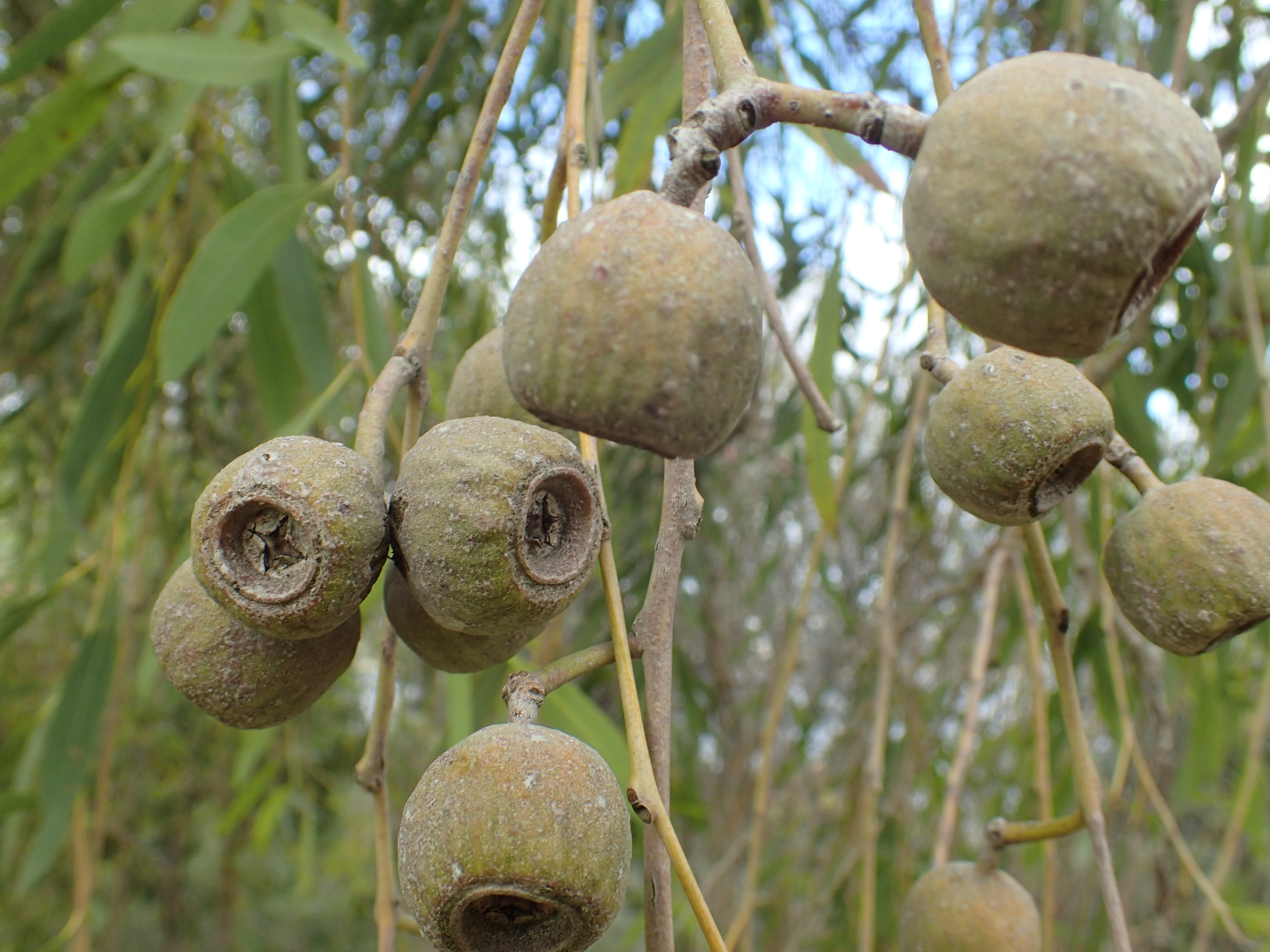
Fruit

Eucalyptus todtiana, commonly known as coastal blackbutt pricklybark or dwutta, is a species of tree or a mallee that is endemic to the west coast of Western Australia. It has rough, fibrous and flaky bark on the trunk, smooth bark on the branches, lance-shaped adult leaves, flower buds in groups of between seven and eleven, white flowers and cup-shaped to hemispherical fruit.

== Description ==
Eucalyptus todtiana is a tree or a mallee that typically grows to a height of between 2–15 m (6 ft 7 in – 49 ft 3 in) and forms a lignotuber. It has a weeping habit and rough, fibrous, prickly bark on the lower trunk, rough, scaly bark on the upper trunk and smooth grey to pinkish bark on the branches. Young plants and coppice regrowth have sessile leaves that are elliptical to oblong, 55–130 mm (2.2–5.1 in) long and 10–16 mm (0.39–0.63 in) wide and arranged in opposite pairs. Adult leaves are arranged alternately, light green, lance-shaped, 80–125 mm (3.1–4.9 in) long and 15–22 mm (0.59–0.87 in), tapering to a petiole 4–22 mm (0.16–0.87 in) long. The plant has a dense, spreading to pendulous crown.

The flower buds are arranged in leaf axils in groups of seven, nine or eleven on an unbranched peduncle 12–35 mm (0.47–1.38 in) long, the individual buds on pedicels 1–3 mm (0.039–0.118 in) long. Mature buds are oval, 8–11 mm (0.31–0.43 in) long and 6–7 mm (0.24–0.28 in) wide with a conical to rounded operculum. Flowering occurs from January to April and the flowers are creamy white. The fruit is a woody cup-shaped to hemispherical capsule 11–21 mm (0.43–0.83 in) long and 14–25 mm (0.55–0.98 in) wide with the valves near rim level.

== Taxonomy and naming ==
Eucalyptus todtiana was first formally described by Ferdinand von Mueller in 1882, based on specimens collected by him from sandy ridges near the Greenough and Arrowsmith Rivers in 1877, and also specimens collected by John Forrest from near the Moore River. The description was published in the journal Southern Science Record. The specific name honours Emil Todt, a botanical artist who drew some of the plates for Mueller's Atlas of Eucalypts.

Mueller also described E. todtiana in his Eucalyptographia, referring to his earlier description in Southern Science Record.

This species is part of the Eucalyptus subgenus series Diversiformae, subseries Neuropterae, a group of mallees that all have adult leaves held erect, buds with a single unscarred operculum and pyramidal seeds.

== Distribution and habitat ==
Coastal blackbutt grows in scrub and in open woodland on sandy flats and gentle slopes on the coastal plain between Perth and Dongara in the Avon Wheatbelt, Geraldton Sandplains, Jarrah Forest and Swan Coastal Plain biogeographic regions.

== Ecology ==
The slow growing, long lived species is a habitat tree for many local fauna such as nectar-feeding birds, bats, lizards and insects.

== Conservation status ==
This eucalypt is classified as "not threatened" by the Western Australian Government Department of Parks and Wildlife.

== Use in horticulture ==
Eucalyptus todtiana is not often grown in cultivation. It grows rapidly as a sapling if planted in an open position, but as an adult it grows slowly and flowers profusely. It is both frost and drought tolerant.

== Uses ==
Indigenous Australians used parts of the tree for medicinal purposes. The leaves as a nasal decongestant or as an antibacterial poultice by crushing the leaves. Leaves were also eaten to relieve dysentery. The gum was also used on sores as an ointment. Leaves from the tree were also commonly used for bedding.

=== Gallery ===
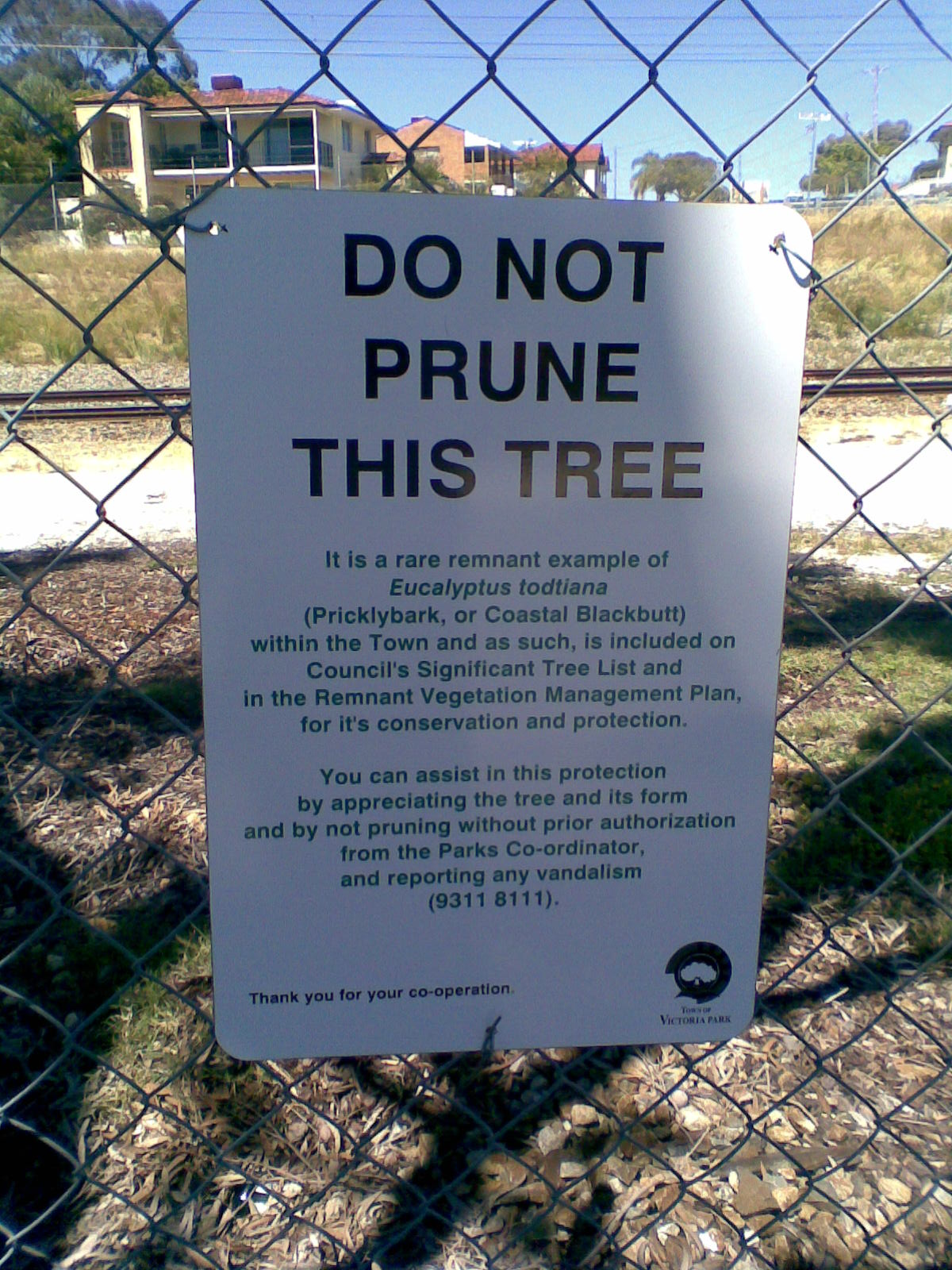
Conservation sign adjacent to Victoria Park specimen

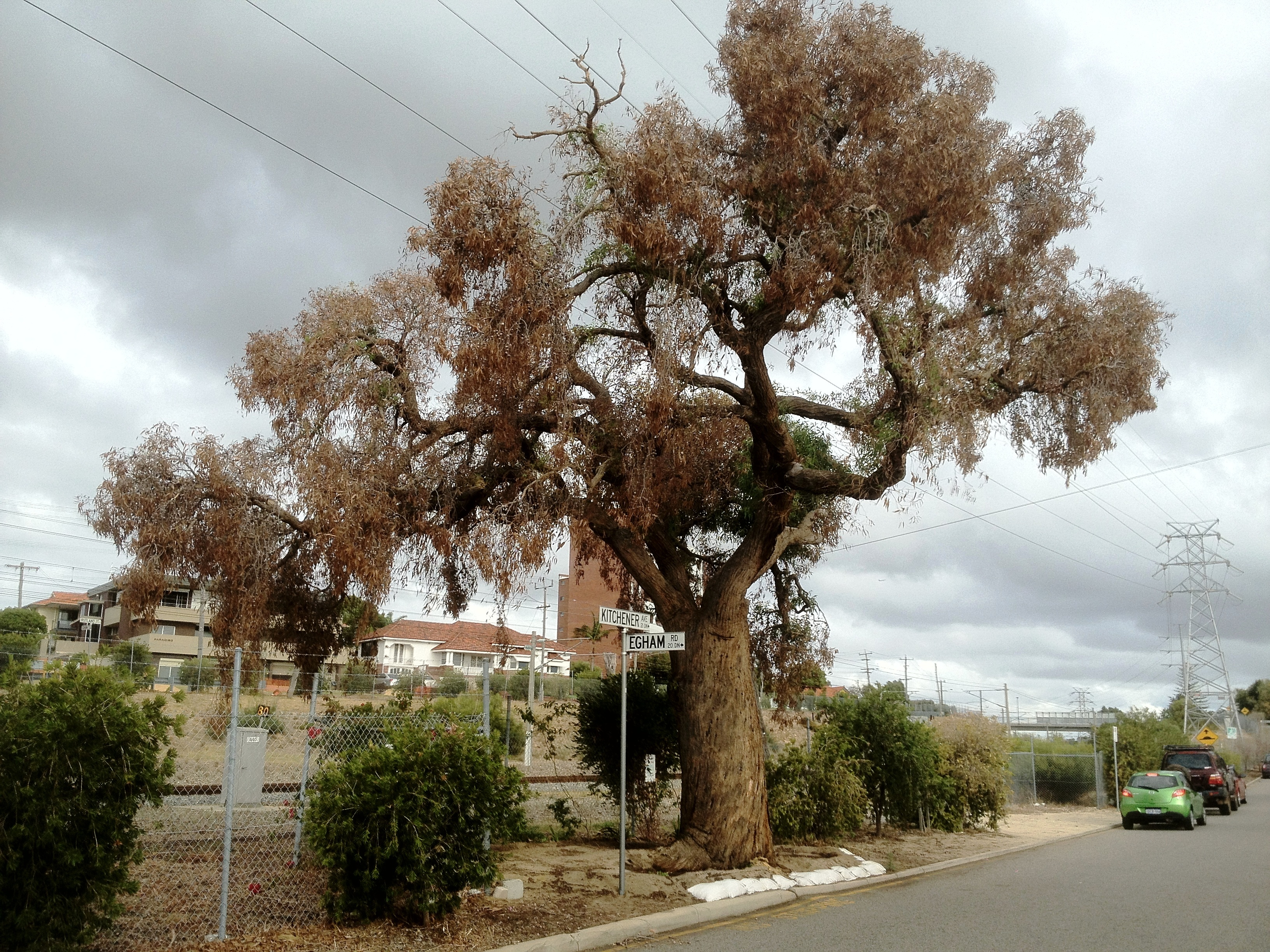
The same tree as above, five years later in 2012. In poor condition despite the conservation warnings.

== See also ==
- List of Eucalyptus species
